

43001–43100 

|-bgcolor=#d6d6d6
| 43001 ||  || — || October 29, 1999 || Catalina || CSS || KOR || align=right | 5.1 km || 
|-id=002 bgcolor=#fefefe
| 43002 ||  || — || October 29, 1999 || Catalina || CSS || V || align=right | 1.4 km || 
|-id=003 bgcolor=#fefefe
| 43003 ||  || — || October 29, 1999 || Catalina || CSS || — || align=right | 1.9 km || 
|-id=004 bgcolor=#E9E9E9
| 43004 ||  || — || October 29, 1999 || Catalina || CSS || — || align=right | 2.9 km || 
|-id=005 bgcolor=#fefefe
| 43005 ||  || — || October 30, 1999 || Catalina || CSS || — || align=right | 2.4 km || 
|-id=006 bgcolor=#d6d6d6
| 43006 ||  || — || October 30, 1999 || Catalina || CSS || — || align=right | 7.5 km || 
|-id=007 bgcolor=#fefefe
| 43007 ||  || — || October 30, 1999 || Kitt Peak || Spacewatch || NYS || align=right | 1.6 km || 
|-id=008 bgcolor=#fefefe
| 43008 ||  || — || October 31, 1999 || Kitt Peak || Spacewatch || moon || align=right | 2.1 km || 
|-id=009 bgcolor=#E9E9E9
| 43009 ||  || — || October 29, 1999 || Anderson Mesa || LONEOS || — || align=right | 8.0 km || 
|-id=010 bgcolor=#E9E9E9
| 43010 ||  || — || October 17, 1999 || Anderson Mesa || LONEOS || — || align=right | 3.9 km || 
|-id=011 bgcolor=#fefefe
| 43011 ||  || — || October 20, 1999 || Socorro || LINEAR || FLO || align=right | 2.4 km || 
|-id=012 bgcolor=#E9E9E9
| 43012 ||  || — || October 30, 1999 || Catalina || CSS || — || align=right | 2.2 km || 
|-id=013 bgcolor=#fefefe
| 43013 ||  || — || October 30, 1999 || Catalina || CSS || NYS || align=right | 1.5 km || 
|-id=014 bgcolor=#d6d6d6
| 43014 ||  || — || October 31, 1999 || Catalina || CSS || EOS || align=right | 8.5 km || 
|-id=015 bgcolor=#fefefe
| 43015 ||  || — || October 31, 1999 || Catalina || CSS || V || align=right | 1.7 km || 
|-id=016 bgcolor=#E9E9E9
| 43016 || 1999 VM || — || November 2, 1999 || Oaxaca || J. M. Roe || — || align=right | 3.7 km || 
|-id=017 bgcolor=#FA8072
| 43017 ||  || — || November 5, 1999 || Oaxaca || J. M. Roe || — || align=right | 2.2 km || 
|-id=018 bgcolor=#E9E9E9
| 43018 ||  || — || November 4, 1999 || Nachi-Katsuura || Y. Shimizu, T. Urata || GEF || align=right | 4.6 km || 
|-id=019 bgcolor=#d6d6d6
| 43019 ||  || — || November 1, 1999 || Kitt Peak || Spacewatch || THM || align=right | 9.8 km || 
|-id=020 bgcolor=#E9E9E9
| 43020 ||  || — || November 1, 1999 || Catalina || CSS || — || align=right | 4.4 km || 
|-id=021 bgcolor=#E9E9E9
| 43021 ||  || — || November 4, 1999 || Nachi-Katsuura || Y. Shimizu, T. Urata || — || align=right | 4.0 km || 
|-id=022 bgcolor=#d6d6d6
| 43022 ||  || — || November 7, 1999 || Višnjan Observatory || K. Korlević || — || align=right | 13 km || 
|-id=023 bgcolor=#fefefe
| 43023 ||  || — || November 11, 1999 || Fountain Hills || C. W. Juels || — || align=right | 3.2 km || 
|-id=024 bgcolor=#E9E9E9
| 43024 ||  || — || November 11, 1999 || Fountain Hills || C. W. Juels || — || align=right | 9.6 km || 
|-id=025 bgcolor=#fefefe
| 43025 Valusha ||  ||  || November 1, 1999 || Uccle || E. W. Elst, S. I. Ipatov || NYS || align=right | 1.9 km || 
|-id=026 bgcolor=#E9E9E9
| 43026 ||  || — || November 11, 1999 || Fountain Hills || C. W. Juels || EUN || align=right | 4.0 km || 
|-id=027 bgcolor=#E9E9E9
| 43027 ||  || — || November 12, 1999 || Gnosca || S. Sposetti || — || align=right | 3.9 km || 
|-id=028 bgcolor=#E9E9E9
| 43028 ||  || — || November 12, 1999 || Gnosca || S. Sposetti || — || align=right | 5.6 km || 
|-id=029 bgcolor=#fefefe
| 43029 ||  || — || November 13, 1999 || Oizumi || T. Kobayashi || NYS || align=right | 3.3 km || 
|-id=030 bgcolor=#E9E9E9
| 43030 ||  || — || November 13, 1999 || Oizumi || T. Kobayashi || — || align=right | 2.9 km || 
|-id=031 bgcolor=#E9E9E9
| 43031 ||  || — || November 14, 1999 || Farpoint || G. Hug, G. Bell || — || align=right | 3.9 km || 
|-id=032 bgcolor=#d6d6d6
| 43032 ||  || — || November 3, 1999 || Socorro || LINEAR || KAR || align=right | 4.4 km || 
|-id=033 bgcolor=#d6d6d6
| 43033 ||  || — || November 3, 1999 || Socorro || LINEAR || URS || align=right | 10 km || 
|-id=034 bgcolor=#E9E9E9
| 43034 ||  || — || November 3, 1999 || Socorro || LINEAR || — || align=right | 4.4 km || 
|-id=035 bgcolor=#d6d6d6
| 43035 ||  || — || November 3, 1999 || Socorro || LINEAR || — || align=right | 8.4 km || 
|-id=036 bgcolor=#fefefe
| 43036 ||  || — || November 3, 1999 || Socorro || LINEAR || — || align=right | 4.6 km || 
|-id=037 bgcolor=#d6d6d6
| 43037 ||  || — || November 3, 1999 || Socorro || LINEAR || — || align=right | 8.7 km || 
|-id=038 bgcolor=#fefefe
| 43038 ||  || — || November 4, 1999 || Catalina || CSS || — || align=right | 2.9 km || 
|-id=039 bgcolor=#E9E9E9
| 43039 ||  || — || November 4, 1999 || Catalina || CSS || — || align=right | 2.9 km || 
|-id=040 bgcolor=#fefefe
| 43040 ||  || — || November 4, 1999 || Catalina || CSS || V || align=right | 2.0 km || 
|-id=041 bgcolor=#E9E9E9
| 43041 ||  || — || November 4, 1999 || Socorro || LINEAR || EUN || align=right | 3.6 km || 
|-id=042 bgcolor=#E9E9E9
| 43042 ||  || — || November 4, 1999 || Socorro || LINEAR || — || align=right | 3.7 km || 
|-id=043 bgcolor=#E9E9E9
| 43043 ||  || — || November 3, 1999 || Socorro || LINEAR || — || align=right | 5.5 km || 
|-id=044 bgcolor=#E9E9E9
| 43044 ||  || — || November 3, 1999 || Socorro || LINEAR || WIT || align=right | 3.2 km || 
|-id=045 bgcolor=#d6d6d6
| 43045 ||  || — || November 3, 1999 || Socorro || LINEAR || — || align=right | 6.6 km || 
|-id=046 bgcolor=#fefefe
| 43046 ||  || — || November 3, 1999 || Socorro || LINEAR || — || align=right | 2.4 km || 
|-id=047 bgcolor=#E9E9E9
| 43047 ||  || — || November 4, 1999 || Socorro || LINEAR || — || align=right | 2.5 km || 
|-id=048 bgcolor=#E9E9E9
| 43048 ||  || — || November 4, 1999 || Socorro || LINEAR || — || align=right | 3.6 km || 
|-id=049 bgcolor=#E9E9E9
| 43049 ||  || — || November 4, 1999 || Socorro || LINEAR || — || align=right | 4.0 km || 
|-id=050 bgcolor=#E9E9E9
| 43050 ||  || — || November 4, 1999 || Socorro || LINEAR || — || align=right | 9.4 km || 
|-id=051 bgcolor=#d6d6d6
| 43051 ||  || — || November 4, 1999 || Socorro || LINEAR || KOR || align=right | 4.1 km || 
|-id=052 bgcolor=#fefefe
| 43052 ||  || — || November 4, 1999 || Socorro || LINEAR || slow || align=right | 1.7 km || 
|-id=053 bgcolor=#E9E9E9
| 43053 ||  || — || November 11, 1999 || Xinglong || SCAP || — || align=right | 3.8 km || 
|-id=054 bgcolor=#fefefe
| 43054 ||  || — || November 4, 1999 || Socorro || LINEAR || NYS || align=right | 2.1 km || 
|-id=055 bgcolor=#E9E9E9
| 43055 ||  || — || November 5, 1999 || Socorro || LINEAR || — || align=right | 2.8 km || 
|-id=056 bgcolor=#d6d6d6
| 43056 ||  || — || November 4, 1999 || Socorro || LINEAR || KOR || align=right | 3.2 km || 
|-id=057 bgcolor=#E9E9E9
| 43057 ||  || — || November 9, 1999 || Socorro || LINEAR || — || align=right | 3.2 km || 
|-id=058 bgcolor=#fefefe
| 43058 ||  || — || November 9, 1999 || Socorro || LINEAR || NYS || align=right | 3.0 km || 
|-id=059 bgcolor=#E9E9E9
| 43059 ||  || — || November 9, 1999 || Socorro || LINEAR || — || align=right | 2.0 km || 
|-id=060 bgcolor=#fefefe
| 43060 ||  || — || November 9, 1999 || Socorro || LINEAR || MAS || align=right | 1.8 km || 
|-id=061 bgcolor=#fefefe
| 43061 ||  || — || November 9, 1999 || Socorro || LINEAR || — || align=right | 2.0 km || 
|-id=062 bgcolor=#E9E9E9
| 43062 ||  || — || November 9, 1999 || Socorro || LINEAR || — || align=right | 2.8 km || 
|-id=063 bgcolor=#fefefe
| 43063 ||  || — || November 9, 1999 || Socorro || LINEAR || NYS || align=right | 1.4 km || 
|-id=064 bgcolor=#fefefe
| 43064 ||  || — || November 9, 1999 || Catalina || CSS || — || align=right | 3.5 km || 
|-id=065 bgcolor=#fefefe
| 43065 ||  || — || November 10, 1999 || Socorro || LINEAR || — || align=right | 3.4 km || 
|-id=066 bgcolor=#fefefe
| 43066 ||  || — || November 13, 1999 || Anderson Mesa || LONEOS || FLO || align=right | 2.0 km || 
|-id=067 bgcolor=#fefefe
| 43067 ||  || — || November 10, 1999 || Kitt Peak || Spacewatch || NYS || align=right | 1.3 km || 
|-id=068 bgcolor=#E9E9E9
| 43068 ||  || — || November 14, 1999 || Socorro || LINEAR || HOF || align=right | 6.0 km || 
|-id=069 bgcolor=#E9E9E9
| 43069 ||  || — || November 14, 1999 || Socorro || LINEAR || — || align=right | 2.5 km || 
|-id=070 bgcolor=#d6d6d6
| 43070 ||  || — || November 14, 1999 || Socorro || LINEAR || — || align=right | 4.2 km || 
|-id=071 bgcolor=#E9E9E9
| 43071 ||  || — || November 15, 1999 || Socorro || LINEAR || PAD || align=right | 5.0 km || 
|-id=072 bgcolor=#fefefe
| 43072 ||  || — || November 6, 1999 || Socorro || LINEAR || — || align=right | 2.6 km || 
|-id=073 bgcolor=#fefefe
| 43073 ||  || — || November 15, 1999 || Socorro || LINEAR || — || align=right | 2.3 km || 
|-id=074 bgcolor=#d6d6d6
| 43074 ||  || — || November 15, 1999 || Socorro || LINEAR || CHA || align=right | 6.1 km || 
|-id=075 bgcolor=#d6d6d6
| 43075 ||  || — || November 15, 1999 || Socorro || LINEAR || — || align=right | 4.4 km || 
|-id=076 bgcolor=#E9E9E9
| 43076 ||  || — || November 15, 1999 || Socorro || LINEAR || — || align=right | 4.5 km || 
|-id=077 bgcolor=#E9E9E9
| 43077 ||  || — || November 14, 1999 || Socorro || LINEAR || — || align=right | 2.8 km || 
|-id=078 bgcolor=#fefefe
| 43078 ||  || — || November 1, 1999 || Anderson Mesa || LONEOS || V || align=right | 1.9 km || 
|-id=079 bgcolor=#d6d6d6
| 43079 ||  || — || November 1, 1999 || Catalina || CSS || — || align=right | 4.9 km || 
|-id=080 bgcolor=#E9E9E9
| 43080 ||  || — || November 3, 1999 || Catalina || CSS || — || align=right | 2.8 km || 
|-id=081 bgcolor=#fefefe
| 43081 Stephenschwartz ||  ||  || November 4, 1999 || Anderson Mesa || LONEOS || FLO || align=right | 2.2 km || 
|-id=082 bgcolor=#E9E9E9
| 43082 ||  || — || November 3, 1999 || Socorro || LINEAR || — || align=right | 3.1 km || 
|-id=083 bgcolor=#fefefe
| 43083 Frankconrad || 1999 WR ||  || November 19, 1999 || Baton Rouge || W. R. Cooney Jr. || — || align=right | 3.8 km || 
|-id=084 bgcolor=#E9E9E9
| 43084 ||  || — || November 30, 1999 || Socorro || LINEAR || — || align=right | 13 km || 
|-id=085 bgcolor=#E9E9E9
| 43085 ||  || — || November 19, 1999 || Ondřejov || P. Kušnirák || — || align=right | 3.2 km || 
|-id=086 bgcolor=#d6d6d6
| 43086 ||  || — || November 28, 1999 || Višnjan Observatory || K. Korlević || — || align=right | 3.8 km || 
|-id=087 bgcolor=#d6d6d6
| 43087 ||  || — || November 28, 1999 || Gnosca || S. Sposetti || THB || align=right | 13 km || 
|-id=088 bgcolor=#fefefe
| 43088 ||  || — || November 30, 1999 || Chiyoda || T. Kojima || — || align=right | 2.9 km || 
|-id=089 bgcolor=#d6d6d6
| 43089 ||  || — || November 29, 1999 || Kitt Peak || Spacewatch || — || align=right | 9.1 km || 
|-id=090 bgcolor=#E9E9E9
| 43090 ||  || — || November 16, 1999 || Socorro || LINEAR || — || align=right | 3.5 km || 
|-id=091 bgcolor=#d6d6d6
| 43091 ||  || — || December 2, 1999 || Oizumi || T. Kobayashi || INA || align=right | 9.8 km || 
|-id=092 bgcolor=#d6d6d6
| 43092 ||  || — || December 4, 1999 || Catalina || CSS || KOR || align=right | 3.2 km || 
|-id=093 bgcolor=#d6d6d6
| 43093 ||  || — || December 4, 1999 || Catalina || CSS || — || align=right | 9.0 km || 
|-id=094 bgcolor=#E9E9E9
| 43094 ||  || — || December 4, 1999 || Fountain Hills || C. W. Juels || EUN || align=right | 8.1 km || 
|-id=095 bgcolor=#d6d6d6
| 43095 ||  || — || December 3, 1999 || Oizumi || T. Kobayashi || VER || align=right | 9.6 km || 
|-id=096 bgcolor=#fefefe
| 43096 ||  || — || December 5, 1999 || Catalina || CSS || — || align=right | 2.7 km || 
|-id=097 bgcolor=#E9E9E9
| 43097 ||  || — || December 5, 1999 || Socorro || LINEAR || — || align=right | 3.8 km || 
|-id=098 bgcolor=#fefefe
| 43098 ||  || — || December 5, 1999 || Socorro || LINEAR || — || align=right | 2.5 km || 
|-id=099 bgcolor=#d6d6d6
| 43099 ||  || — || December 5, 1999 || Višnjan Observatory || K. Korlević || — || align=right | 10 km || 
|-id=100 bgcolor=#E9E9E9
| 43100 ||  || — || December 6, 1999 || Višnjan Observatory || K. Korlević || — || align=right | 5.8 km || 
|}

43101–43200 

|-bgcolor=#fefefe
| 43101 ||  || — || December 3, 1999 || Socorro || LINEAR || — || align=right | 2.7 km || 
|-id=102 bgcolor=#E9E9E9
| 43102 ||  || — || December 5, 1999 || Socorro || LINEAR || — || align=right | 5.3 km || 
|-id=103 bgcolor=#fefefe
| 43103 ||  || — || December 5, 1999 || Socorro || LINEAR || — || align=right | 2.4 km || 
|-id=104 bgcolor=#E9E9E9
| 43104 ||  || — || December 5, 1999 || Socorro || LINEAR || — || align=right | 3.8 km || 
|-id=105 bgcolor=#E9E9E9
| 43105 ||  || — || December 6, 1999 || Socorro || LINEAR || — || align=right | 3.3 km || 
|-id=106 bgcolor=#d6d6d6
| 43106 ||  || — || December 6, 1999 || Socorro || LINEAR || EOS || align=right | 5.4 km || 
|-id=107 bgcolor=#E9E9E9
| 43107 ||  || — || December 6, 1999 || Socorro || LINEAR || — || align=right | 4.9 km || 
|-id=108 bgcolor=#d6d6d6
| 43108 ||  || — || December 6, 1999 || Socorro || LINEAR || KOR || align=right | 3.2 km || 
|-id=109 bgcolor=#E9E9E9
| 43109 ||  || — || December 6, 1999 || Socorro || LINEAR || — || align=right | 5.8 km || 
|-id=110 bgcolor=#d6d6d6
| 43110 ||  || — || December 6, 1999 || Socorro || LINEAR || — || align=right | 16 km || 
|-id=111 bgcolor=#d6d6d6
| 43111 ||  || — || December 6, 1999 || Socorro || LINEAR || HYG || align=right | 7.3 km || 
|-id=112 bgcolor=#d6d6d6
| 43112 ||  || — || December 6, 1999 || Socorro || LINEAR || EOS || align=right | 7.2 km || 
|-id=113 bgcolor=#d6d6d6
| 43113 ||  || — || December 6, 1999 || Socorro || LINEAR || EOS || align=right | 7.3 km || 
|-id=114 bgcolor=#d6d6d6
| 43114 ||  || — || December 7, 1999 || Fountain Hills || C. W. Juels || SAN || align=right | 7.6 km || 
|-id=115 bgcolor=#E9E9E9
| 43115 ||  || — || December 6, 1999 || Socorro || LINEAR || ADE || align=right | 4.7 km || 
|-id=116 bgcolor=#E9E9E9
| 43116 ||  || — || December 6, 1999 || Socorro || LINEAR || — || align=right | 6.4 km || 
|-id=117 bgcolor=#E9E9E9
| 43117 ||  || — || December 7, 1999 || Socorro || LINEAR || — || align=right | 2.7 km || 
|-id=118 bgcolor=#d6d6d6
| 43118 ||  || — || December 7, 1999 || Socorro || LINEAR || EOS || align=right | 5.5 km || 
|-id=119 bgcolor=#d6d6d6
| 43119 ||  || — || December 7, 1999 || Socorro || LINEAR || HYG || align=right | 8.1 km || 
|-id=120 bgcolor=#fefefe
| 43120 ||  || — || December 7, 1999 || Socorro || LINEAR || — || align=right | 3.3 km || 
|-id=121 bgcolor=#d6d6d6
| 43121 ||  || — || December 7, 1999 || Socorro || LINEAR || — || align=right | 3.8 km || 
|-id=122 bgcolor=#E9E9E9
| 43122 ||  || — || December 7, 1999 || Socorro || LINEAR || — || align=right | 2.2 km || 
|-id=123 bgcolor=#E9E9E9
| 43123 ||  || — || December 7, 1999 || Socorro || LINEAR || RAF || align=right | 4.7 km || 
|-id=124 bgcolor=#E9E9E9
| 43124 ||  || — || December 7, 1999 || Socorro || LINEAR || AST || align=right | 6.4 km || 
|-id=125 bgcolor=#E9E9E9
| 43125 ||  || — || December 7, 1999 || Socorro || LINEAR || — || align=right | 6.4 km || 
|-id=126 bgcolor=#d6d6d6
| 43126 ||  || — || December 7, 1999 || Socorro || LINEAR || THM || align=right | 7.4 km || 
|-id=127 bgcolor=#d6d6d6
| 43127 ||  || — || December 7, 1999 || Socorro || LINEAR || — || align=right | 7.8 km || 
|-id=128 bgcolor=#E9E9E9
| 43128 ||  || — || December 7, 1999 || Socorro || LINEAR || — || align=right | 3.6 km || 
|-id=129 bgcolor=#E9E9E9
| 43129 ||  || — || December 7, 1999 || Socorro || LINEAR || — || align=right | 3.6 km || 
|-id=130 bgcolor=#E9E9E9
| 43130 ||  || — || December 7, 1999 || Socorro || LINEAR || — || align=right | 6.3 km || 
|-id=131 bgcolor=#E9E9E9
| 43131 ||  || — || December 7, 1999 || Socorro || LINEAR || — || align=right | 4.1 km || 
|-id=132 bgcolor=#E9E9E9
| 43132 ||  || — || December 7, 1999 || Socorro || LINEAR || — || align=right | 4.4 km || 
|-id=133 bgcolor=#E9E9E9
| 43133 ||  || — || December 7, 1999 || Socorro || LINEAR || ADE || align=right | 6.4 km || 
|-id=134 bgcolor=#E9E9E9
| 43134 ||  || — || December 7, 1999 || Socorro || LINEAR || — || align=right | 8.6 km || 
|-id=135 bgcolor=#d6d6d6
| 43135 ||  || — || December 7, 1999 || Socorro || LINEAR || — || align=right | 7.7 km || 
|-id=136 bgcolor=#d6d6d6
| 43136 ||  || — || December 7, 1999 || Socorro || LINEAR || — || align=right | 6.1 km || 
|-id=137 bgcolor=#d6d6d6
| 43137 ||  || — || December 7, 1999 || Socorro || LINEAR || — || align=right | 12 km || 
|-id=138 bgcolor=#E9E9E9
| 43138 ||  || — || December 7, 1999 || Socorro || LINEAR || — || align=right | 3.5 km || 
|-id=139 bgcolor=#d6d6d6
| 43139 ||  || — || December 7, 1999 || Socorro || LINEAR || URS || align=right | 18 km || 
|-id=140 bgcolor=#E9E9E9
| 43140 ||  || — || December 7, 1999 || Socorro || LINEAR || MAR || align=right | 4.8 km || 
|-id=141 bgcolor=#E9E9E9
| 43141 ||  || — || December 7, 1999 || Socorro || LINEAR || — || align=right | 4.9 km || 
|-id=142 bgcolor=#E9E9E9
| 43142 ||  || — || December 7, 1999 || Socorro || LINEAR || — || align=right | 6.0 km || 
|-id=143 bgcolor=#d6d6d6
| 43143 ||  || — || December 7, 1999 || Socorro || LINEAR || — || align=right | 9.2 km || 
|-id=144 bgcolor=#E9E9E9
| 43144 ||  || — || December 7, 1999 || Socorro || LINEAR || — || align=right | 3.6 km || 
|-id=145 bgcolor=#d6d6d6
| 43145 ||  || — || December 7, 1999 || Socorro || LINEAR || — || align=right | 13 km || 
|-id=146 bgcolor=#d6d6d6
| 43146 ||  || — || December 7, 1999 || Socorro || LINEAR || — || align=right | 5.6 km || 
|-id=147 bgcolor=#E9E9E9
| 43147 ||  || — || December 8, 1999 || Nachi-Katsuura || H. Shiozawa, T. Urata || — || align=right | 3.8 km || 
|-id=148 bgcolor=#E9E9E9
| 43148 ||  || — || December 11, 1999 || Oizumi || T. Kobayashi || — || align=right | 8.0 km || 
|-id=149 bgcolor=#E9E9E9
| 43149 ||  || — || December 4, 1999 || Catalina || CSS || — || align=right | 3.4 km || 
|-id=150 bgcolor=#fefefe
| 43150 ||  || — || December 4, 1999 || Catalina || CSS || — || align=right | 2.2 km || 
|-id=151 bgcolor=#E9E9E9
| 43151 ||  || — || December 11, 1999 || Socorro || LINEAR || — || align=right | 4.8 km || 
|-id=152 bgcolor=#d6d6d6
| 43152 ||  || — || December 4, 1999 || Catalina || CSS || LIX || align=right | 16 km || 
|-id=153 bgcolor=#E9E9E9
| 43153 ||  || — || December 5, 1999 || Catalina || CSS || PAD || align=right | 6.9 km || 
|-id=154 bgcolor=#E9E9E9
| 43154 ||  || — || December 5, 1999 || Catalina || CSS || WIT || align=right | 3.0 km || 
|-id=155 bgcolor=#d6d6d6
| 43155 ||  || — || December 5, 1999 || Catalina || CSS || EOS || align=right | 6.3 km || 
|-id=156 bgcolor=#E9E9E9
| 43156 ||  || — || December 5, 1999 || Catalina || CSS || — || align=right | 5.7 km || 
|-id=157 bgcolor=#fefefe
| 43157 ||  || — || December 5, 1999 || Catalina || CSS || — || align=right | 3.7 km || 
|-id=158 bgcolor=#fefefe
| 43158 ||  || — || December 5, 1999 || Catalina || CSS || NYS || align=right | 2.8 km || 
|-id=159 bgcolor=#d6d6d6
| 43159 ||  || — || December 5, 1999 || Catalina || CSS || — || align=right | 3.3 km || 
|-id=160 bgcolor=#d6d6d6
| 43160 ||  || — || December 7, 1999 || Catalina || CSS || EOS || align=right | 7.4 km || 
|-id=161 bgcolor=#E9E9E9
| 43161 ||  || — || December 7, 1999 || Catalina || CSS || EUN || align=right | 4.4 km || 
|-id=162 bgcolor=#E9E9E9
| 43162 ||  || — || December 7, 1999 || Catalina || CSS || slow || align=right | 7.5 km || 
|-id=163 bgcolor=#d6d6d6
| 43163 ||  || — || December 7, 1999 || Catalina || CSS || — || align=right | 11 km || 
|-id=164 bgcolor=#d6d6d6
| 43164 ||  || — || December 8, 1999 || Socorro || LINEAR || EOS || align=right | 4.4 km || 
|-id=165 bgcolor=#E9E9E9
| 43165 ||  || — || December 8, 1999 || Socorro || LINEAR || — || align=right | 3.1 km || 
|-id=166 bgcolor=#E9E9E9
| 43166 ||  || — || December 8, 1999 || Socorro || LINEAR || — || align=right | 6.6 km || 
|-id=167 bgcolor=#d6d6d6
| 43167 ||  || — || December 8, 1999 || Socorro || LINEAR || — || align=right | 3.7 km || 
|-id=168 bgcolor=#E9E9E9
| 43168 ||  || — || December 13, 1999 || Socorro || LINEAR || EUN || align=right | 4.1 km || 
|-id=169 bgcolor=#E9E9E9
| 43169 ||  || — || December 10, 1999 || Socorro || LINEAR || EUN || align=right | 5.1 km || 
|-id=170 bgcolor=#E9E9E9
| 43170 ||  || — || December 10, 1999 || Socorro || LINEAR || — || align=right | 4.7 km || 
|-id=171 bgcolor=#d6d6d6
| 43171 ||  || — || December 10, 1999 || Socorro || LINEAR || — || align=right | 11 km || 
|-id=172 bgcolor=#d6d6d6
| 43172 ||  || — || December 10, 1999 || Socorro || LINEAR || — || align=right | 12 km || 
|-id=173 bgcolor=#d6d6d6
| 43173 ||  || — || December 10, 1999 || Socorro || LINEAR || URS || align=right | 18 km || 
|-id=174 bgcolor=#E9E9E9
| 43174 ||  || — || December 10, 1999 || Socorro || LINEAR || MAR || align=right | 5.5 km || 
|-id=175 bgcolor=#fefefe
| 43175 ||  || — || December 12, 1999 || Socorro || LINEAR || — || align=right | 2.7 km || 
|-id=176 bgcolor=#d6d6d6
| 43176 ||  || — || December 12, 1999 || Socorro || LINEAR || EOS || align=right | 5.6 km || 
|-id=177 bgcolor=#d6d6d6
| 43177 ||  || — || December 12, 1999 || Socorro || LINEAR || — || align=right | 6.4 km || 
|-id=178 bgcolor=#d6d6d6
| 43178 ||  || — || December 12, 1999 || Socorro || LINEAR || — || align=right | 7.1 km || 
|-id=179 bgcolor=#d6d6d6
| 43179 ||  || — || December 12, 1999 || Socorro || LINEAR || URS || align=right | 12 km || 
|-id=180 bgcolor=#d6d6d6
| 43180 ||  || — || December 12, 1999 || Socorro || LINEAR || — || align=right | 11 km || 
|-id=181 bgcolor=#d6d6d6
| 43181 ||  || — || December 12, 1999 || Socorro || LINEAR || — || align=right | 13 km || 
|-id=182 bgcolor=#fefefe
| 43182 ||  || — || December 14, 1999 || Socorro || LINEAR || FLO || align=right | 2.6 km || 
|-id=183 bgcolor=#d6d6d6
| 43183 ||  || — || December 14, 1999 || Socorro || LINEAR || — || align=right | 7.6 km || 
|-id=184 bgcolor=#d6d6d6
| 43184 ||  || — || December 14, 1999 || Socorro || LINEAR || EOS || align=right | 5.4 km || 
|-id=185 bgcolor=#E9E9E9
| 43185 ||  || — || December 15, 1999 || Socorro || LINEAR || — || align=right | 4.0 km || 
|-id=186 bgcolor=#E9E9E9
| 43186 ||  || — || December 7, 1999 || Anderson Mesa || LONEOS || — || align=right | 2.8 km || 
|-id=187 bgcolor=#E9E9E9
| 43187 ||  || — || December 2, 1999 || Anderson Mesa || LONEOS || — || align=right | 3.4 km || 
|-id=188 bgcolor=#E9E9E9
| 43188 Zouxiaoduan ||  ||  || December 3, 1999 || Anderson Mesa || LONEOS || PAD || align=right | 6.4 km || 
|-id=189 bgcolor=#E9E9E9
| 43189 ||  || — || December 7, 1999 || Socorro || LINEAR || — || align=right | 4.0 km || 
|-id=190 bgcolor=#E9E9E9
| 43190 ||  || — || December 13, 1999 || Anderson Mesa || LONEOS || — || align=right | 4.6 km || 
|-id=191 bgcolor=#d6d6d6
| 43191 ||  || — || December 29, 1999 || Črni Vrh || Črni Vrh || — || align=right | 7.3 km || 
|-id=192 bgcolor=#E9E9E9
| 43192 ||  || — || December 30, 1999 || Anderson Mesa || LONEOS || — || align=right | 4.7 km || 
|-id=193 bgcolor=#d6d6d6
| 43193 Secinaro ||  ||  || January 1, 2000 || San Marcello || L. Tesi, A. Boattini || THM || align=right | 6.8 km || 
|-id=194 bgcolor=#d6d6d6
| 43194 ||  || — || January 4, 2000 || Prescott || P. G. Comba || THM || align=right | 8.7 km || 
|-id=195 bgcolor=#d6d6d6
| 43195 ||  || — || January 3, 2000 || Socorro || LINEAR || — || align=right | 8.7 km || 
|-id=196 bgcolor=#fefefe
| 43196 ||  || — || January 3, 2000 || Socorro || LINEAR || — || align=right | 2.4 km || 
|-id=197 bgcolor=#fefefe
| 43197 ||  || — || January 5, 2000 || Kitt Peak || Spacewatch || MAS || align=right | 1.8 km || 
|-id=198 bgcolor=#d6d6d6
| 43198 ||  || — || January 4, 2000 || Socorro || LINEAR || EOS || align=right | 6.1 km || 
|-id=199 bgcolor=#d6d6d6
| 43199 ||  || — || January 5, 2000 || Socorro || LINEAR || — || align=right | 16 km || 
|-id=200 bgcolor=#fefefe
| 43200 ||  || — || January 5, 2000 || Socorro || LINEAR || — || align=right | 2.1 km || 
|}

43201–43300 

|-bgcolor=#E9E9E9
| 43201 ||  || — || January 5, 2000 || Socorro || LINEAR || — || align=right | 3.5 km || 
|-id=202 bgcolor=#d6d6d6
| 43202 ||  || — || January 5, 2000 || Socorro || LINEAR || ALA || align=right | 16 km || 
|-id=203 bgcolor=#E9E9E9
| 43203 ||  || — || January 5, 2000 || Socorro || LINEAR || — || align=right | 4.2 km || 
|-id=204 bgcolor=#d6d6d6
| 43204 ||  || — || January 5, 2000 || Socorro || LINEAR || — || align=right | 11 km || 
|-id=205 bgcolor=#d6d6d6
| 43205 ||  || — || January 5, 2000 || Socorro || LINEAR || — || align=right | 9.9 km || 
|-id=206 bgcolor=#d6d6d6
| 43206 ||  || — || January 5, 2000 || Socorro || LINEAR || TEL || align=right | 4.5 km || 
|-id=207 bgcolor=#E9E9E9
| 43207 ||  || — || January 5, 2000 || Socorro || LINEAR || — || align=right | 3.1 km || 
|-id=208 bgcolor=#d6d6d6
| 43208 ||  || — || January 5, 2000 || Socorro || LINEAR || TIR || align=right | 7.0 km || 
|-id=209 bgcolor=#fefefe
| 43209 ||  || — || January 5, 2000 || Socorro || LINEAR || — || align=right | 2.4 km || 
|-id=210 bgcolor=#fefefe
| 43210 ||  || — || January 5, 2000 || Socorro || LINEAR || FLO || align=right | 2.4 km || 
|-id=211 bgcolor=#E9E9E9
| 43211 ||  || — || January 5, 2000 || Socorro || LINEAR || — || align=right | 3.4 km || 
|-id=212 bgcolor=#C2FFFF
| 43212 Katosawao ||  ||  || January 5, 2000 || Socorro || LINEAR || L4ERY || align=right | 19 km || 
|-id=213 bgcolor=#d6d6d6
| 43213 ||  || — || January 3, 2000 || Socorro || LINEAR || — || align=right | 8.8 km || 
|-id=214 bgcolor=#d6d6d6
| 43214 ||  || — || January 4, 2000 || Socorro || LINEAR || HYG || align=right | 8.9 km || 
|-id=215 bgcolor=#fefefe
| 43215 ||  || — || January 5, 2000 || Socorro || LINEAR || V || align=right | 2.8 km || 
|-id=216 bgcolor=#fefefe
| 43216 ||  || — || January 5, 2000 || Socorro || LINEAR || V || align=right | 2.2 km || 
|-id=217 bgcolor=#fefefe
| 43217 ||  || — || January 5, 2000 || Socorro || LINEAR || V || align=right | 2.4 km || 
|-id=218 bgcolor=#d6d6d6
| 43218 ||  || — || January 5, 2000 || Socorro || LINEAR || EOS || align=right | 9.1 km || 
|-id=219 bgcolor=#d6d6d6
| 43219 ||  || — || January 7, 2000 || Socorro || LINEAR || EOS || align=right | 4.1 km || 
|-id=220 bgcolor=#d6d6d6
| 43220 ||  || — || January 8, 2000 || Socorro || LINEAR || — || align=right | 8.5 km || 
|-id=221 bgcolor=#fefefe
| 43221 ||  || — || January 8, 2000 || Socorro || LINEAR || — || align=right | 3.2 km || 
|-id=222 bgcolor=#fefefe
| 43222 ||  || — || January 3, 2000 || Socorro || LINEAR || MAS || align=right | 3.0 km || 
|-id=223 bgcolor=#fefefe
| 43223 ||  || — || January 4, 2000 || Socorro || LINEAR || — || align=right | 2.4 km || 
|-id=224 bgcolor=#E9E9E9
| 43224 Tonypensa ||  ||  || January 8, 2000 || Socorro || LINEAR || EUN || align=right | 4.0 km || 
|-id=225 bgcolor=#d6d6d6
| 43225 ||  || — || January 8, 2000 || Socorro || LINEAR || — || align=right | 8.4 km || 
|-id=226 bgcolor=#d6d6d6
| 43226 ||  || — || January 8, 2000 || Socorro || LINEAR || — || align=right | 7.7 km || 
|-id=227 bgcolor=#d6d6d6
| 43227 ||  || — || January 8, 2000 || Socorro || LINEAR || — || align=right | 14 km || 
|-id=228 bgcolor=#d6d6d6
| 43228 ||  || — || January 7, 2000 || Socorro || LINEAR || EOS || align=right | 5.7 km || 
|-id=229 bgcolor=#d6d6d6
| 43229 ||  || — || January 7, 2000 || Socorro || LINEAR || — || align=right | 10 km || 
|-id=230 bgcolor=#d6d6d6
| 43230 ||  || — || January 7, 2000 || Socorro || LINEAR || — || align=right | 9.9 km || 
|-id=231 bgcolor=#d6d6d6
| 43231 ||  || — || January 7, 2000 || Socorro || LINEAR || — || align=right | 18 km || 
|-id=232 bgcolor=#E9E9E9
| 43232 ||  || — || January 7, 2000 || Socorro || LINEAR || — || align=right | 7.0 km || 
|-id=233 bgcolor=#d6d6d6
| 43233 ||  || — || January 7, 2000 || Socorro || LINEAR || EOS || align=right | 5.7 km || 
|-id=234 bgcolor=#E9E9E9
| 43234 ||  || — || January 8, 2000 || Socorro || LINEAR || — || align=right | 4.1 km || 
|-id=235 bgcolor=#d6d6d6
| 43235 ||  || — || January 8, 2000 || Socorro || LINEAR || — || align=right | 6.7 km || 
|-id=236 bgcolor=#d6d6d6
| 43236 ||  || — || January 8, 2000 || Socorro || LINEAR || — || align=right | 12 km || 
|-id=237 bgcolor=#d6d6d6
| 43237 ||  || — || January 6, 2000 || Ondřejov || P. Kušnirák || EOS || align=right | 4.5 km || 
|-id=238 bgcolor=#E9E9E9
| 43238 ||  || — || January 5, 2000 || Socorro || LINEAR || — || align=right | 2.4 km || 
|-id=239 bgcolor=#d6d6d6
| 43239 ||  || — || January 6, 2000 || Kitt Peak || Spacewatch || — || align=right | 6.6 km || 
|-id=240 bgcolor=#d6d6d6
| 43240 ||  || — || January 7, 2000 || Socorro || LINEAR || — || align=right | 9.4 km || 
|-id=241 bgcolor=#E9E9E9
| 43241 ||  || — || January 8, 2000 || Socorro || LINEAR || — || align=right | 3.3 km || 
|-id=242 bgcolor=#E9E9E9
| 43242 ||  || — || January 8, 2000 || Anderson Mesa || LONEOS || HNS || align=right | 3.8 km || 
|-id=243 bgcolor=#d6d6d6
| 43243 ||  || — || January 7, 2000 || Kitt Peak || Spacewatch || THM || align=right | 5.4 km || 
|-id=244 bgcolor=#d6d6d6
| 43244 ||  || — || January 7, 2000 || Kitt Peak || Spacewatch || THM || align=right | 8.0 km || 
|-id=245 bgcolor=#E9E9E9
| 43245 ||  || — || January 31, 2000 || Oizumi || T. Kobayashi || — || align=right | 7.5 km || 
|-id=246 bgcolor=#E9E9E9
| 43246 ||  || — || January 30, 2000 || Socorro || LINEAR || — || align=right | 3.1 km || 
|-id=247 bgcolor=#d6d6d6
| 43247 ||  || — || January 30, 2000 || Socorro || LINEAR || — || align=right | 7.2 km || 
|-id=248 bgcolor=#E9E9E9
| 43248 ||  || — || January 29, 2000 || Kitt Peak || Spacewatch || GEF || align=right | 4.4 km || 
|-id=249 bgcolor=#d6d6d6
| 43249 ||  || — || January 29, 2000 || Socorro || LINEAR || — || align=right | 5.4 km || 
|-id=250 bgcolor=#E9E9E9
| 43250 ||  || — || February 2, 2000 || Socorro || LINEAR || — || align=right | 3.4 km || 
|-id=251 bgcolor=#d6d6d6
| 43251 ||  || — || February 2, 2000 || Socorro || LINEAR || — || align=right | 14 km || 
|-id=252 bgcolor=#d6d6d6
| 43252 ||  || — || February 2, 2000 || Socorro || LINEAR || THM || align=right | 7.4 km || 
|-id=253 bgcolor=#E9E9E9
| 43253 ||  || — || February 2, 2000 || Socorro || LINEAR || — || align=right | 3.7 km || 
|-id=254 bgcolor=#E9E9E9
| 43254 ||  || — || February 2, 2000 || Socorro || LINEAR || — || align=right | 4.9 km || 
|-id=255 bgcolor=#fefefe
| 43255 ||  || — || February 2, 2000 || Socorro || LINEAR || — || align=right | 3.3 km || 
|-id=256 bgcolor=#d6d6d6
| 43256 ||  || — || February 4, 2000 || Socorro || LINEAR || KOR || align=right | 3.7 km || 
|-id=257 bgcolor=#fefefe
| 43257 ||  || — || February 4, 2000 || Socorro || LINEAR || V || align=right | 1.9 km || 
|-id=258 bgcolor=#E9E9E9
| 43258 ||  || — || February 6, 2000 || Socorro || LINEAR || PAD || align=right | 7.1 km || 
|-id=259 bgcolor=#E9E9E9
| 43259 Wangzhenyi ||  ||  || February 8, 2000 || Xinglong || SCAP || — || align=right | 6.2 km || 
|-id=260 bgcolor=#d6d6d6
| 43260 ||  || — || February 3, 2000 || Socorro || LINEAR || VER || align=right | 11 km || 
|-id=261 bgcolor=#fefefe
| 43261 ||  || — || February 27, 2000 || Oizumi || T. Kobayashi || KLI || align=right | 6.6 km || 
|-id=262 bgcolor=#d6d6d6
| 43262 ||  || — || February 28, 2000 || Socorro || LINEAR || HYG || align=right | 10 km || 
|-id=263 bgcolor=#d6d6d6
| 43263 ||  || — || February 29, 2000 || Socorro || LINEAR || KOR || align=right | 3.7 km || 
|-id=264 bgcolor=#E9E9E9
| 43264 ||  || — || February 29, 2000 || Socorro || LINEAR || — || align=right | 1.7 km || 
|-id=265 bgcolor=#fefefe
| 43265 ||  || — || February 29, 2000 || Socorro || LINEAR || — || align=right | 1.3 km || 
|-id=266 bgcolor=#d6d6d6
| 43266 ||  || — || February 28, 2000 || Socorro || LINEAR || — || align=right | 7.5 km || 
|-id=267 bgcolor=#d6d6d6
| 43267 ||  || — || February 28, 2000 || Socorro || LINEAR || HYG || align=right | 8.2 km || 
|-id=268 bgcolor=#fefefe
| 43268 ||  || — || February 28, 2000 || Socorro || LINEAR || — || align=right | 2.4 km || 
|-id=269 bgcolor=#d6d6d6
| 43269 ||  || — || February 29, 2000 || Socorro || LINEAR || EOS || align=right | 6.5 km || 
|-id=270 bgcolor=#E9E9E9
| 43270 ||  || — || March 3, 2000 || Socorro || LINEAR || — || align=right | 4.1 km || 
|-id=271 bgcolor=#E9E9E9
| 43271 ||  || — || March 5, 2000 || Socorro || LINEAR || PAD || align=right | 7.4 km || 
|-id=272 bgcolor=#fefefe
| 43272 ||  || — || March 5, 2000 || Socorro || LINEAR || — || align=right | 3.5 km || 
|-id=273 bgcolor=#fefefe
| 43273 ||  || — || March 8, 2000 || Socorro || LINEAR || — || align=right | 1.7 km || 
|-id=274 bgcolor=#fefefe
| 43274 ||  || — || March 8, 2000 || Socorro || LINEAR || NYS || align=right | 2.4 km || 
|-id=275 bgcolor=#E9E9E9
| 43275 ||  || — || March 9, 2000 || Socorro || LINEAR || — || align=right | 5.8 km || 
|-id=276 bgcolor=#fefefe
| 43276 ||  || — || March 9, 2000 || Socorro || LINEAR || — || align=right | 3.6 km || 
|-id=277 bgcolor=#d6d6d6
| 43277 ||  || — || March 10, 2000 || Socorro || LINEAR || — || align=right | 12 km || 
|-id=278 bgcolor=#E9E9E9
| 43278 ||  || — || March 8, 2000 || Haleakala || NEAT || — || align=right | 5.2 km || 
|-id=279 bgcolor=#d6d6d6
| 43279 ||  || — || March 9, 2000 || Socorro || LINEAR || — || align=right | 3.7 km || 
|-id=280 bgcolor=#fefefe
| 43280 ||  || — || March 11, 2000 || Anderson Mesa || LONEOS || — || align=right | 1.6 km || 
|-id=281 bgcolor=#fefefe
| 43281 ||  || — || March 7, 2000 || Socorro || LINEAR || — || align=right | 3.3 km || 
|-id=282 bgcolor=#fefefe
| 43282 Dougbock ||  ||  || March 14, 2000 || Catalina || CSS || FLO || align=right | 2.9 km || 
|-id=283 bgcolor=#E9E9E9
| 43283 Robinbock ||  ||  || March 3, 2000 || Catalina || CSS || — || align=right | 7.3 km || 
|-id=284 bgcolor=#fefefe
| 43284 ||  || — || March 5, 2000 || Haleakala || NEAT || — || align=right | 3.0 km || 
|-id=285 bgcolor=#fefefe
| 43285 ||  || — || March 9, 2000 || Socorro || LINEAR || — || align=right | 2.3 km || 
|-id=286 bgcolor=#E9E9E9
| 43286 ||  || — || March 12, 2000 || Anderson Mesa || LONEOS || fast? || align=right | 7.2 km || 
|-id=287 bgcolor=#E9E9E9
| 43287 ||  || — || March 28, 2000 || Socorro || LINEAR || EUN || align=right | 4.7 km || 
|-id=288 bgcolor=#fefefe
| 43288 ||  || — || March 28, 2000 || Socorro || LINEAR || FLO || align=right | 4.1 km || 
|-id=289 bgcolor=#E9E9E9
| 43289 ||  || — || March 29, 2000 || Socorro || LINEAR || — || align=right | 3.9 km || 
|-id=290 bgcolor=#d6d6d6
| 43290 ||  || — || March 30, 2000 || Socorro || LINEAR || — || align=right | 9.9 km || 
|-id=291 bgcolor=#d6d6d6
| 43291 ||  || — || March 30, 2000 || Socorro || LINEAR || EOS || align=right | 6.9 km || 
|-id=292 bgcolor=#E9E9E9
| 43292 ||  || — || March 30, 2000 || Socorro || LINEAR || — || align=right | 4.7 km || 
|-id=293 bgcolor=#d6d6d6
| 43293 Banting ||  ||  || April 1, 2000 || Reedy Creek || J. Broughton || — || align=right | 10 km || 
|-id=294 bgcolor=#E9E9E9
| 43294 ||  || — || April 2, 2000 || Socorro || LINEAR || — || align=right | 3.8 km || 
|-id=295 bgcolor=#fefefe
| 43295 ||  || — || April 5, 2000 || Socorro || LINEAR || FLO || align=right | 2.9 km || 
|-id=296 bgcolor=#fefefe
| 43296 ||  || — || April 5, 2000 || Socorro || LINEAR || — || align=right | 2.5 km || 
|-id=297 bgcolor=#fefefe
| 43297 ||  || — || April 5, 2000 || Socorro || LINEAR || V || align=right | 1.3 km || 
|-id=298 bgcolor=#E9E9E9
| 43298 ||  || — || April 5, 2000 || Socorro || LINEAR || GEF || align=right | 3.4 km || 
|-id=299 bgcolor=#E9E9E9
| 43299 ||  || — || April 5, 2000 || Socorro || LINEAR || — || align=right | 1.8 km || 
|-id=300 bgcolor=#fefefe
| 43300 ||  || — || April 4, 2000 || Socorro || LINEAR || V || align=right | 2.4 km || 
|}

43301–43400 

|-bgcolor=#fefefe
| 43301 ||  || — || April 7, 2000 || Socorro || LINEAR || — || align=right | 4.5 km || 
|-id=302 bgcolor=#fefefe
| 43302 ||  || — || April 7, 2000 || Socorro || LINEAR || — || align=right | 2.7 km || 
|-id=303 bgcolor=#d6d6d6
| 43303 ||  || — || April 7, 2000 || Socorro || LINEAR || — || align=right | 6.9 km || 
|-id=304 bgcolor=#E9E9E9
| 43304 ||  || — || April 7, 2000 || Socorro || LINEAR || — || align=right | 4.1 km || 
|-id=305 bgcolor=#E9E9E9
| 43305 ||  || — || April 7, 2000 || Anderson Mesa || LONEOS || — || align=right | 3.9 km || 
|-id=306 bgcolor=#fefefe
| 43306 ||  || — || April 7, 2000 || Socorro || LINEAR || V || align=right | 4.2 km || 
|-id=307 bgcolor=#fefefe
| 43307 ||  || — || April 28, 2000 || Socorro || LINEAR || NYS || align=right | 5.6 km || 
|-id=308 bgcolor=#fefefe
| 43308 ||  || — || April 27, 2000 || Socorro || LINEAR || — || align=right | 2.1 km || 
|-id=309 bgcolor=#fefefe
| 43309 ||  || — || April 25, 2000 || Anderson Mesa || LONEOS || — || align=right | 1.7 km || 
|-id=310 bgcolor=#fefefe
| 43310 ||  || — || April 28, 2000 || Socorro || LINEAR || — || align=right | 3.6 km || 
|-id=311 bgcolor=#fefefe
| 43311 ||  || — || April 29, 2000 || Socorro || LINEAR || V || align=right | 2.0 km || 
|-id=312 bgcolor=#fefefe
| 43312 ||  || — || April 27, 2000 || Socorro || LINEAR || — || align=right | 1.8 km || 
|-id=313 bgcolor=#fefefe
| 43313 || 2000 JW || — || May 1, 2000 || Socorro || LINEAR || KLI || align=right | 3.7 km || 
|-id=314 bgcolor=#E9E9E9
| 43314 ||  || — || May 5, 2000 || Socorro || LINEAR || — || align=right | 3.5 km || 
|-id=315 bgcolor=#fefefe
| 43315 ||  || — || May 6, 2000 || Socorro || LINEAR || NYS || align=right | 2.4 km || 
|-id=316 bgcolor=#fefefe
| 43316 ||  || — || May 6, 2000 || Socorro || LINEAR || — || align=right | 3.0 km || 
|-id=317 bgcolor=#fefefe
| 43317 ||  || — || May 6, 2000 || Socorro || LINEAR || NYS || align=right | 4.9 km || 
|-id=318 bgcolor=#E9E9E9
| 43318 ||  || — || May 7, 2000 || Socorro || LINEAR || — || align=right | 3.5 km || 
|-id=319 bgcolor=#fefefe
| 43319 ||  || — || May 7, 2000 || Socorro || LINEAR || — || align=right | 2.9 km || 
|-id=320 bgcolor=#fefefe
| 43320 ||  || — || May 7, 2000 || Socorro || LINEAR || — || align=right | 2.3 km || 
|-id=321 bgcolor=#E9E9E9
| 43321 ||  || — || May 9, 2000 || Socorro || LINEAR || — || align=right | 3.7 km || 
|-id=322 bgcolor=#E9E9E9
| 43322 ||  || — || May 2, 2000 || Socorro || LINEAR || — || align=right | 3.8 km || 
|-id=323 bgcolor=#fefefe
| 43323 ||  || — || May 2, 2000 || Anderson Mesa || LONEOS || — || align=right | 2.0 km || 
|-id=324 bgcolor=#E9E9E9
| 43324 ||  || — || May 28, 2000 || Socorro || LINEAR || — || align=right | 4.7 km || 
|-id=325 bgcolor=#E9E9E9
| 43325 ||  || — || May 29, 2000 || Socorro || LINEAR || — || align=right | 5.0 km || 
|-id=326 bgcolor=#fefefe
| 43326 ||  || — || May 28, 2000 || Anderson Mesa || LONEOS || — || align=right | 2.1 km || 
|-id=327 bgcolor=#E9E9E9
| 43327 ||  || — || June 4, 2000 || Socorro || LINEAR || GEF || align=right | 3.7 km || 
|-id=328 bgcolor=#fefefe
| 43328 ||  || — || July 23, 2000 || Socorro || LINEAR || — || align=right | 5.0 km || 
|-id=329 bgcolor=#fefefe
| 43329 ||  || — || July 23, 2000 || Socorro || LINEAR || FLO || align=right | 1.8 km || 
|-id=330 bgcolor=#fefefe
| 43330 ||  || — || July 30, 2000 || Socorro || LINEAR || — || align=right | 2.4 km || 
|-id=331 bgcolor=#fefefe
| 43331 ||  || — || August 3, 2000 || Socorro || LINEAR || H || align=right | 1.4 km || 
|-id=332 bgcolor=#fefefe
| 43332 ||  || — || August 24, 2000 || Višnjan Observatory || K. Korlević, M. Jurić || — || align=right | 3.2 km || 
|-id=333 bgcolor=#fefefe
| 43333 ||  || — || August 28, 2000 || Socorro || LINEAR || — || align=right | 3.1 km || 
|-id=334 bgcolor=#fefefe
| 43334 ||  || — || August 28, 2000 || Socorro || LINEAR || H || align=right | 2.2 km || 
|-id=335 bgcolor=#fefefe
| 43335 ||  || — || August 24, 2000 || Socorro || LINEAR || MAS || align=right | 3.0 km || 
|-id=336 bgcolor=#E9E9E9
| 43336 ||  || — || August 31, 2000 || Socorro || LINEAR || — || align=right | 2.8 km || 
|-id=337 bgcolor=#fefefe
| 43337 ||  || — || September 1, 2000 || Socorro || LINEAR || — || align=right | 5.8 km || 
|-id=338 bgcolor=#E9E9E9
| 43338 ||  || — || September 1, 2000 || Socorro || LINEAR || — || align=right | 3.6 km || 
|-id=339 bgcolor=#fefefe
| 43339 ||  || — || September 1, 2000 || Socorro || LINEAR || — || align=right | 2.9 km || 
|-id=340 bgcolor=#E9E9E9
| 43340 ||  || — || September 3, 2000 || Socorro || LINEAR || — || align=right | 7.4 km || 
|-id=341 bgcolor=#E9E9E9
| 43341 ||  || — || September 1, 2000 || Socorro || LINEAR || MAR || align=right | 5.6 km || 
|-id=342 bgcolor=#d6d6d6
| 43342 ||  || — || September 1, 2000 || Socorro || LINEAR || ALA || align=right | 12 km || 
|-id=343 bgcolor=#d6d6d6
| 43343 ||  || — || September 1, 2000 || Socorro || LINEAR || TIR || align=right | 11 km || 
|-id=344 bgcolor=#fefefe
| 43344 ||  || — || September 2, 2000 || Anderson Mesa || LONEOS || V || align=right | 2.0 km || 
|-id=345 bgcolor=#E9E9E9
| 43345 ||  || — || September 2, 2000 || Haleakala || NEAT || — || align=right | 3.3 km || 
|-id=346 bgcolor=#fefefe
| 43346 ||  || — || September 6, 2000 || Socorro || LINEAR || KLI || align=right | 8.1 km || 
|-id=347 bgcolor=#E9E9E9
| 43347 ||  || — || September 23, 2000 || Socorro || LINEAR || ADE || align=right | 6.8 km || 
|-id=348 bgcolor=#fefefe
| 43348 ||  || — || September 24, 2000 || Socorro || LINEAR || NYS || align=right | 1.6 km || 
|-id=349 bgcolor=#fefefe
| 43349 ||  || — || September 27, 2000 || Socorro || LINEAR || — || align=right | 4.9 km || 
|-id=350 bgcolor=#fefefe
| 43350 ||  || — || September 27, 2000 || Socorro || LINEAR || — || align=right | 2.1 km || 
|-id=351 bgcolor=#fefefe
| 43351 ||  || — || September 24, 2000 || Socorro || LINEAR || FLO || align=right | 1.9 km || 
|-id=352 bgcolor=#fefefe
| 43352 ||  || — || September 26, 2000 || Socorro || LINEAR || NYS || align=right | 1.7 km || 
|-id=353 bgcolor=#fefefe
| 43353 ||  || — || September 28, 2000 || Socorro || LINEAR || — || align=right | 3.6 km || 
|-id=354 bgcolor=#d6d6d6
| 43354 ||  || — || September 30, 2000 || Socorro || LINEAR || ALA || align=right | 17 km || 
|-id=355 bgcolor=#fefefe
| 43355 ||  || — || September 27, 2000 || Socorro || LINEAR || — || align=right | 5.7 km || 
|-id=356 bgcolor=#E9E9E9
| 43356 ||  || — || October 3, 2000 || Socorro || LINEAR || — || align=right | 9.1 km || 
|-id=357 bgcolor=#fefefe
| 43357 ||  || — || October 24, 2000 || Socorro || LINEAR || H || align=right | 1.7 km || 
|-id=358 bgcolor=#d6d6d6
| 43358 ||  || — || October 29, 2000 || Kitt Peak || Spacewatch || KOR || align=right | 3.7 km || 
|-id=359 bgcolor=#fefefe
| 43359 ||  || — || October 24, 2000 || Socorro || LINEAR || — || align=right | 2.5 km || 
|-id=360 bgcolor=#fefefe
| 43360 ||  || — || October 24, 2000 || Socorro || LINEAR || FLO || align=right | 2.5 km || 
|-id=361 bgcolor=#fefefe
| 43361 ||  || — || October 24, 2000 || Socorro || LINEAR || FLO || align=right | 2.0 km || 
|-id=362 bgcolor=#fefefe
| 43362 ||  || — || November 1, 2000 || Socorro || LINEAR || — || align=right | 3.0 km || 
|-id=363 bgcolor=#fefefe
| 43363 ||  || — || November 1, 2000 || Socorro || LINEAR || — || align=right | 3.0 km || 
|-id=364 bgcolor=#fefefe
| 43364 ||  || — || November 1, 2000 || Socorro || LINEAR || — || align=right | 2.6 km || 
|-id=365 bgcolor=#fefefe
| 43365 ||  || — || November 1, 2000 || Socorro || LINEAR || FLO || align=right | 2.1 km || 
|-id=366 bgcolor=#fefefe
| 43366 ||  || — || November 1, 2000 || Socorro || LINEAR || — || align=right | 5.4 km || 
|-id=367 bgcolor=#E9E9E9
| 43367 ||  || — || November 3, 2000 || Socorro || LINEAR || MAR || align=right | 3.4 km || 
|-id=368 bgcolor=#fefefe
| 43368 Rodrigoleiva ||  ||  || November 14, 2000 || Anderson Mesa || LONEOS || PHO || align=right | 3.2 km || 
|-id=369 bgcolor=#FA8072
| 43369 ||  || — || November 17, 2000 || Socorro || LINEAR || H || align=right | 2.4 km || 
|-id=370 bgcolor=#E9E9E9
| 43370 ||  || — || November 19, 2000 || Socorro || LINEAR || RAF || align=right | 5.1 km || 
|-id=371 bgcolor=#fefefe
| 43371 ||  || — || November 20, 2000 || Socorro || LINEAR || — || align=right | 2.2 km || 
|-id=372 bgcolor=#fefefe
| 43372 ||  || — || November 20, 2000 || Socorro || LINEAR || PHO || align=right | 4.4 km || 
|-id=373 bgcolor=#fefefe
| 43373 ||  || — || November 21, 2000 || Socorro || LINEAR || SUL || align=right | 6.7 km || 
|-id=374 bgcolor=#fefefe
| 43374 ||  || — || November 20, 2000 || Socorro || LINEAR || — || align=right | 2.2 km || 
|-id=375 bgcolor=#fefefe
| 43375 ||  || — || November 20, 2000 || Socorro || LINEAR || — || align=right | 2.7 km || 
|-id=376 bgcolor=#fefefe
| 43376 ||  || — || November 20, 2000 || Socorro || LINEAR || — || align=right | 2.7 km || 
|-id=377 bgcolor=#fefefe
| 43377 ||  || — || November 20, 2000 || Socorro || LINEAR || — || align=right | 2.5 km || 
|-id=378 bgcolor=#fefefe
| 43378 ||  || — || November 21, 2000 || Socorro || LINEAR || — || align=right | 2.6 km || 
|-id=379 bgcolor=#fefefe
| 43379 ||  || — || November 21, 2000 || Socorro || LINEAR || — || align=right | 2.5 km || 
|-id=380 bgcolor=#fefefe
| 43380 ||  || — || November 21, 2000 || Socorro || LINEAR || — || align=right | 1.9 km || 
|-id=381 bgcolor=#fefefe
| 43381 ||  || — || November 21, 2000 || Socorro || LINEAR || — || align=right | 1.9 km || 
|-id=382 bgcolor=#d6d6d6
| 43382 ||  || — || November 21, 2000 || Socorro || LINEAR || — || align=right | 12 km || 
|-id=383 bgcolor=#E9E9E9
| 43383 ||  || — || November 27, 2000 || Kitt Peak || Spacewatch || — || align=right | 2.2 km || 
|-id=384 bgcolor=#fefefe
| 43384 ||  || — || November 20, 2000 || Socorro || LINEAR || — || align=right | 3.1 km || 
|-id=385 bgcolor=#fefefe
| 43385 ||  || — || November 20, 2000 || Socorro || LINEAR || V || align=right | 2.1 km || 
|-id=386 bgcolor=#fefefe
| 43386 ||  || — || November 21, 2000 || Socorro || LINEAR || NYS || align=right | 1.9 km || 
|-id=387 bgcolor=#fefefe
| 43387 ||  || — || November 21, 2000 || Socorro || LINEAR || — || align=right | 2.5 km || 
|-id=388 bgcolor=#fefefe
| 43388 ||  || — || November 21, 2000 || Socorro || LINEAR || V || align=right | 2.5 km || 
|-id=389 bgcolor=#fefefe
| 43389 ||  || — || November 21, 2000 || Socorro || LINEAR || — || align=right | 2.1 km || 
|-id=390 bgcolor=#d6d6d6
| 43390 ||  || — || November 26, 2000 || Socorro || LINEAR || 7:4 || align=right | 27 km || 
|-id=391 bgcolor=#fefefe
| 43391 ||  || — || November 28, 2000 || Fountain Hills || C. W. Juels || — || align=right | 4.4 km || 
|-id=392 bgcolor=#fefefe
| 43392 ||  || — || November 20, 2000 || Socorro || LINEAR || — || align=right | 4.2 km || 
|-id=393 bgcolor=#fefefe
| 43393 ||  || — || November 20, 2000 || Socorro || LINEAR || — || align=right | 2.2 km || 
|-id=394 bgcolor=#E9E9E9
| 43394 ||  || — || November 20, 2000 || Socorro || LINEAR || — || align=right | 5.2 km || 
|-id=395 bgcolor=#E9E9E9
| 43395 ||  || — || November 20, 2000 || Socorro || LINEAR || MAR || align=right | 3.5 km || 
|-id=396 bgcolor=#fefefe
| 43396 ||  || — || November 21, 2000 || Socorro || LINEAR || — || align=right | 1.8 km || 
|-id=397 bgcolor=#fefefe
| 43397 ||  || — || November 21, 2000 || Socorro || LINEAR || — || align=right | 2.2 km || 
|-id=398 bgcolor=#fefefe
| 43398 ||  || — || November 21, 2000 || Socorro || LINEAR || — || align=right | 3.0 km || 
|-id=399 bgcolor=#E9E9E9
| 43399 ||  || — || November 21, 2000 || Socorro || LINEAR || — || align=right | 5.4 km || 
|-id=400 bgcolor=#fefefe
| 43400 ||  || — || November 21, 2000 || Socorro || LINEAR || — || align=right | 2.3 km || 
|}

43401–43500 

|-bgcolor=#fefefe
| 43401 ||  || — || November 20, 2000 || Socorro || LINEAR || — || align=right | 3.2 km || 
|-id=402 bgcolor=#fefefe
| 43402 ||  || — || November 20, 2000 || Socorro || LINEAR || V || align=right | 1.9 km || 
|-id=403 bgcolor=#fefefe
| 43403 ||  || — || November 29, 2000 || Socorro || LINEAR || — || align=right | 2.8 km || 
|-id=404 bgcolor=#fefefe
| 43404 ||  || — || November 16, 2000 || Kitt Peak || Spacewatch || — || align=right | 2.4 km || 
|-id=405 bgcolor=#fefefe
| 43405 ||  || — || November 19, 2000 || Socorro || LINEAR || — || align=right | 3.4 km || 
|-id=406 bgcolor=#E9E9E9
| 43406 ||  || — || November 19, 2000 || Socorro || LINEAR || — || align=right | 3.7 km || 
|-id=407 bgcolor=#fefefe
| 43407 ||  || — || November 20, 2000 || Socorro || LINEAR || — || align=right | 2.8 km || 
|-id=408 bgcolor=#fefefe
| 43408 ||  || — || November 20, 2000 || Socorro || LINEAR || — || align=right | 2.5 km || 
|-id=409 bgcolor=#fefefe
| 43409 ||  || — || November 28, 2000 || Kitt Peak || Spacewatch || V || align=right | 3.2 km || 
|-id=410 bgcolor=#E9E9E9
| 43410 ||  || — || November 28, 2000 || Kitt Peak || Spacewatch || — || align=right | 2.2 km || 
|-id=411 bgcolor=#E9E9E9
| 43411 ||  || — || November 29, 2000 || Socorro || LINEAR || MAR || align=right | 3.1 km || 
|-id=412 bgcolor=#fefefe
| 43412 ||  || — || November 30, 2000 || Socorro || LINEAR || V || align=right | 1.7 km || 
|-id=413 bgcolor=#fefefe
| 43413 ||  || — || November 30, 2000 || Socorro || LINEAR || — || align=right | 1.5 km || 
|-id=414 bgcolor=#fefefe
| 43414 Sfair ||  ||  || November 25, 2000 || Anderson Mesa || LONEOS || FLO || align=right | 1.9 km || 
|-id=415 bgcolor=#fefefe
| 43415 ||  || — || November 25, 2000 || Anderson Mesa || LONEOS || — || align=right | 2.9 km || 
|-id=416 bgcolor=#E9E9E9
| 43416 ||  || — || November 25, 2000 || Anderson Mesa || LONEOS || EUN || align=right | 3.7 km || 
|-id=417 bgcolor=#fefefe
| 43417 ||  || — || November 25, 2000 || Anderson Mesa || LONEOS || — || align=right | 2.4 km || 
|-id=418 bgcolor=#fefefe
| 43418 ||  || — || December 1, 2000 || Socorro || LINEAR || — || align=right | 3.0 km || 
|-id=419 bgcolor=#E9E9E9
| 43419 ||  || — || December 1, 2000 || Socorro || LINEAR || HNS || align=right | 3.6 km || 
|-id=420 bgcolor=#E9E9E9
| 43420 ||  || — || December 4, 2000 || Socorro || LINEAR || — || align=right | 2.4 km || 
|-id=421 bgcolor=#fefefe
| 43421 ||  || — || December 4, 2000 || Socorro || LINEAR || PHO || align=right | 4.8 km || 
|-id=422 bgcolor=#fefefe
| 43422 ||  || — || December 4, 2000 || Socorro || LINEAR || V || align=right | 1.6 km || 
|-id=423 bgcolor=#E9E9E9
| 43423 ||  || — || December 5, 2000 || Socorro || LINEAR || HNS || align=right | 3.4 km || 
|-id=424 bgcolor=#fefefe
| 43424 ||  || — || December 20, 2000 || Socorro || LINEAR || PHO || align=right | 3.7 km || 
|-id=425 bgcolor=#fefefe
| 43425 ||  || — || December 20, 2000 || Socorro || LINEAR || V || align=right | 1.6 km || 
|-id=426 bgcolor=#fefefe
| 43426 ||  || — || December 20, 2000 || Socorro || LINEAR || — || align=right | 3.0 km || 
|-id=427 bgcolor=#E9E9E9
| 43427 ||  || — || December 23, 2000 || Desert Beaver || W. K. Y. Yeung || — || align=right | 7.4 km || 
|-id=428 bgcolor=#fefefe
| 43428 ||  || — || December 28, 2000 || Bisei SG Center || BATTeRS || — || align=right | 3.2 km || 
|-id=429 bgcolor=#E9E9E9
| 43429 ||  || — || December 22, 2000 || Haleakala || NEAT || — || align=right | 4.4 km || 
|-id=430 bgcolor=#E9E9E9
| 43430 ||  || — || December 28, 2000 || Kitt Peak || Spacewatch || — || align=right | 7.2 km || 
|-id=431 bgcolor=#fefefe
| 43431 ||  || — || December 30, 2000 || Socorro || LINEAR || — || align=right | 2.7 km || 
|-id=432 bgcolor=#fefefe
| 43432 ||  || — || December 30, 2000 || Socorro || LINEAR || — || align=right | 2.5 km || 
|-id=433 bgcolor=#E9E9E9
| 43433 ||  || — || December 30, 2000 || Socorro || LINEAR || — || align=right | 2.5 km || 
|-id=434 bgcolor=#fefefe
| 43434 ||  || — || December 30, 2000 || Socorro || LINEAR || — || align=right | 2.7 km || 
|-id=435 bgcolor=#E9E9E9
| 43435 ||  || — || December 30, 2000 || Socorro || LINEAR || — || align=right | 3.2 km || 
|-id=436 bgcolor=#C2FFFF
| 43436 Ansschut ||  ||  || December 30, 2000 || Socorro || LINEAR || L4ERY || align=right | 20 km || 
|-id=437 bgcolor=#E9E9E9
| 43437 ||  || — || December 30, 2000 || Socorro || LINEAR || — || align=right | 2.7 km || 
|-id=438 bgcolor=#E9E9E9
| 43438 ||  || — || December 30, 2000 || Socorro || LINEAR || — || align=right | 6.7 km || 
|-id=439 bgcolor=#E9E9E9
| 43439 ||  || — || December 30, 2000 || Socorro || LINEAR || — || align=right | 2.5 km || 
|-id=440 bgcolor=#fefefe
| 43440 ||  || — || December 30, 2000 || Socorro || LINEAR || — || align=right | 1.9 km || 
|-id=441 bgcolor=#E9E9E9
| 43441 ||  || — || December 30, 2000 || Socorro || LINEAR || — || align=right | 3.7 km || 
|-id=442 bgcolor=#E9E9E9
| 43442 ||  || — || December 30, 2000 || Socorro || LINEAR || — || align=right | 3.0 km || 
|-id=443 bgcolor=#fefefe
| 43443 ||  || — || December 30, 2000 || Socorro || LINEAR || — || align=right | 2.4 km || 
|-id=444 bgcolor=#fefefe
| 43444 ||  || — || December 30, 2000 || Socorro || LINEAR || — || align=right | 2.3 km || 
|-id=445 bgcolor=#fefefe
| 43445 ||  || — || December 30, 2000 || Socorro || LINEAR || — || align=right | 2.4 km || 
|-id=446 bgcolor=#fefefe
| 43446 ||  || — || December 30, 2000 || Socorro || LINEAR || V || align=right | 2.0 km || 
|-id=447 bgcolor=#fefefe
| 43447 ||  || — || December 30, 2000 || Socorro || LINEAR || — || align=right | 3.9 km || 
|-id=448 bgcolor=#fefefe
| 43448 ||  || — || December 30, 2000 || Socorro || LINEAR || NYS || align=right | 1.9 km || 
|-id=449 bgcolor=#fefefe
| 43449 ||  || — || December 30, 2000 || Socorro || LINEAR || — || align=right | 2.2 km || 
|-id=450 bgcolor=#fefefe
| 43450 ||  || — || December 30, 2000 || Socorro || LINEAR || — || align=right | 3.0 km || 
|-id=451 bgcolor=#fefefe
| 43451 ||  || — || December 30, 2000 || Socorro || LINEAR || — || align=right | 1.8 km || 
|-id=452 bgcolor=#E9E9E9
| 43452 ||  || — || December 30, 2000 || Socorro || LINEAR || — || align=right | 2.2 km || 
|-id=453 bgcolor=#d6d6d6
| 43453 ||  || — || December 31, 2000 || Haleakala || NEAT || — || align=right | 6.8 km || 
|-id=454 bgcolor=#fefefe
| 43454 ||  || — || December 28, 2000 || Socorro || LINEAR || V || align=right | 1.9 km || 
|-id=455 bgcolor=#fefefe
| 43455 ||  || — || December 28, 2000 || Socorro || LINEAR || V || align=right | 2.1 km || 
|-id=456 bgcolor=#fefefe
| 43456 ||  || — || December 30, 2000 || Socorro || LINEAR || FLO || align=right | 2.6 km || 
|-id=457 bgcolor=#fefefe
| 43457 ||  || — || December 30, 2000 || Socorro || LINEAR || V || align=right | 2.0 km || 
|-id=458 bgcolor=#fefefe
| 43458 ||  || — || December 30, 2000 || Socorro || LINEAR || — || align=right | 2.1 km || 
|-id=459 bgcolor=#d6d6d6
| 43459 ||  || — || December 28, 2000 || Kitt Peak || Spacewatch || — || align=right | 5.4 km || 
|-id=460 bgcolor=#d6d6d6
| 43460 ||  || — || December 28, 2000 || Socorro || LINEAR || VER || align=right | 11 km || 
|-id=461 bgcolor=#d6d6d6
| 43461 ||  || — || December 29, 2000 || Haleakala || NEAT || CHA || align=right | 3.0 km || 
|-id=462 bgcolor=#fefefe
| 43462 || 2001 AV || — || January 2, 2001 || Oizumi || T. Kobayashi || — || align=right | 3.0 km || 
|-id=463 bgcolor=#fefefe
| 43463 ||  || — || January 2, 2001 || Socorro || LINEAR || V || align=right | 1.9 km || 
|-id=464 bgcolor=#fefefe
| 43464 ||  || — || January 2, 2001 || Socorro || LINEAR || Vslow || align=right | 2.0 km || 
|-id=465 bgcolor=#E9E9E9
| 43465 ||  || — || January 2, 2001 || Socorro || LINEAR || — || align=right | 3.5 km || 
|-id=466 bgcolor=#E9E9E9
| 43466 ||  || — || January 2, 2001 || Socorro || LINEAR || — || align=right | 3.1 km || 
|-id=467 bgcolor=#fefefe
| 43467 ||  || — || January 2, 2001 || Socorro || LINEAR || FLO || align=right | 2.9 km || 
|-id=468 bgcolor=#fefefe
| 43468 ||  || — || January 4, 2001 || Socorro || LINEAR || — || align=right | 2.8 km || 
|-id=469 bgcolor=#E9E9E9
| 43469 ||  || — || January 4, 2001 || Socorro || LINEAR || EUN || align=right | 5.5 km || 
|-id=470 bgcolor=#fefefe
| 43470 ||  || — || January 4, 2001 || Socorro || LINEAR || — || align=right | 2.3 km || 
|-id=471 bgcolor=#E9E9E9
| 43471 ||  || — || January 4, 2001 || Socorro || LINEAR || GEF || align=right | 3.2 km || 
|-id=472 bgcolor=#d6d6d6
| 43472 ||  || — || January 4, 2001 || Socorro || LINEAR || — || align=right | 12 km || 
|-id=473 bgcolor=#fefefe
| 43473 ||  || — || January 4, 2001 || Socorro || LINEAR || V || align=right | 1.9 km || 
|-id=474 bgcolor=#fefefe
| 43474 ||  || — || January 3, 2001 || Anderson Mesa || LONEOS || — || align=right | 2.0 km || 
|-id=475 bgcolor=#E9E9E9
| 43475 ||  || — || January 3, 2001 || Anderson Mesa || LONEOS || — || align=right | 5.0 km || 
|-id=476 bgcolor=#fefefe
| 43476 ||  || — || January 3, 2001 || Haleakala || NEAT || — || align=right | 3.8 km || 
|-id=477 bgcolor=#E9E9E9
| 43477 ||  || — || January 19, 2001 || Socorro || LINEAR || MAR || align=right | 3.0 km || 
|-id=478 bgcolor=#fefefe
| 43478 ||  || — || January 19, 2001 || Socorro || LINEAR || MAS || align=right | 2.9 km || 
|-id=479 bgcolor=#fefefe
| 43479 ||  || — || January 21, 2001 || Oizumi || T. Kobayashi || — || align=right | 2.0 km || 
|-id=480 bgcolor=#d6d6d6
| 43480 ||  || — || January 21, 2001 || Oizumi || T. Kobayashi || THM || align=right | 6.6 km || 
|-id=481 bgcolor=#E9E9E9
| 43481 ||  || — || January 18, 2001 || Socorro || LINEAR || — || align=right | 6.4 km || 
|-id=482 bgcolor=#fefefe
| 43482 ||  || — || January 20, 2001 || Socorro || LINEAR || ERI || align=right | 2.2 km || 
|-id=483 bgcolor=#d6d6d6
| 43483 ||  || — || January 24, 2001 || Oaxaca || J. M. Roe || — || align=right | 5.9 km || 
|-id=484 bgcolor=#fefefe
| 43484 ||  || — || January 19, 2001 || Socorro || LINEAR || — || align=right | 4.7 km || 
|-id=485 bgcolor=#d6d6d6
| 43485 ||  || — || January 19, 2001 || Socorro || LINEAR || — || align=right | 6.8 km || 
|-id=486 bgcolor=#E9E9E9
| 43486 ||  || — || January 19, 2001 || Kitt Peak || Spacewatch || HEN || align=right | 2.2 km || 
|-id=487 bgcolor=#E9E9E9
| 43487 ||  || — || January 29, 2001 || Oizumi || T. Kobayashi || — || align=right | 5.5 km || 
|-id=488 bgcolor=#d6d6d6
| 43488 ||  || — || January 26, 2001 || Socorro || LINEAR || — || align=right | 12 km || 
|-id=489 bgcolor=#d6d6d6
| 43489 ||  || — || January 31, 2001 || Socorro || LINEAR || URS || align=right | 8.6 km || 
|-id=490 bgcolor=#d6d6d6
| 43490 || 2001 CL || — || February 2, 2001 || Višnjan Observatory || K. Korlević || — || align=right | 10 km || 
|-id=491 bgcolor=#E9E9E9
| 43491 || 2001 CP || — || February 1, 2001 || Socorro || LINEAR || MAR || align=right | 4.2 km || 
|-id=492 bgcolor=#fefefe
| 43492 || 2001 CV || — || February 1, 2001 || Socorro || LINEAR || V || align=right | 1.6 km || 
|-id=493 bgcolor=#E9E9E9
| 43493 ||  || — || February 1, 2001 || Socorro || LINEAR || — || align=right | 5.5 km || 
|-id=494 bgcolor=#E9E9E9
| 43494 ||  || — || February 1, 2001 || Socorro || LINEAR || — || align=right | 2.7 km || 
|-id=495 bgcolor=#fefefe
| 43495 ||  || — || February 1, 2001 || Socorro || LINEAR || NYS || align=right | 1.9 km || 
|-id=496 bgcolor=#fefefe
| 43496 ||  || — || February 1, 2001 || Socorro || LINEAR || V || align=right | 1.4 km || 
|-id=497 bgcolor=#d6d6d6
| 43497 ||  || — || February 2, 2001 || Socorro || LINEAR || — || align=right | 10 km || 
|-id=498 bgcolor=#d6d6d6
| 43498 ||  || — || February 2, 2001 || Socorro || LINEAR || — || align=right | 11 km || 
|-id=499 bgcolor=#fefefe
| 43499 ||  || — || February 3, 2001 || Prescott || P. G. Comba || — || align=right | 2.2 km || 
|-id=500 bgcolor=#d6d6d6
| 43500 ||  || — || February 1, 2001 || Anderson Mesa || LONEOS || THM || align=right | 5.3 km || 
|}

43501–43600 

|-bgcolor=#fefefe
| 43501 ||  || — || February 1, 2001 || Anderson Mesa || LONEOS || NYS || align=right | 2.1 km || 
|-id=502 bgcolor=#fefefe
| 43502 ||  || — || February 2, 2001 || Anderson Mesa || LONEOS || FLO || align=right | 2.3 km || 
|-id=503 bgcolor=#d6d6d6
| 43503 ||  || — || February 2, 2001 || Anderson Mesa || LONEOS || 7:4 || align=right | 15 km || 
|-id=504 bgcolor=#E9E9E9
| 43504 ||  || — || February 13, 2001 || Socorro || LINEAR || MAR || align=right | 2.6 km || 
|-id=505 bgcolor=#E9E9E9
| 43505 ||  || — || February 13, 2001 || Socorro || LINEAR || — || align=right | 3.8 km || 
|-id=506 bgcolor=#d6d6d6
| 43506 ||  || — || February 15, 2001 || Oizumi || T. Kobayashi || — || align=right | 5.7 km || 
|-id=507 bgcolor=#fefefe
| 43507 ||  || — || February 13, 2001 || Socorro || LINEAR || V || align=right | 1.9 km || 
|-id=508 bgcolor=#d6d6d6
| 43508 ||  || — || February 15, 2001 || Socorro || LINEAR || URS || align=right | 7.0 km || 
|-id=509 bgcolor=#E9E9E9
| 43509 ||  || — || February 15, 2001 || Socorro || LINEAR || EUN || align=right | 3.3 km || 
|-id=510 bgcolor=#E9E9E9
| 43510 ||  || — || February 15, 2001 || Socorro || LINEAR || — || align=right | 3.8 km || 
|-id=511 bgcolor=#d6d6d6
| 43511 Cima Ekar ||  ||  || February 11, 2001 || Asiago || ADAS || THM || align=right | 4.8 km || 
|-id=512 bgcolor=#E9E9E9
| 43512 ||  || — || February 2, 2001 || Anderson Mesa || LONEOS || MAR || align=right | 2.6 km || 
|-id=513 bgcolor=#fefefe
| 43513 ||  || — || February 16, 2001 || Socorro || LINEAR || V || align=right | 1.8 km || 
|-id=514 bgcolor=#d6d6d6
| 43514 ||  || — || February 16, 2001 || Socorro || LINEAR || — || align=right | 8.2 km || 
|-id=515 bgcolor=#d6d6d6
| 43515 ||  || — || February 17, 2001 || Socorro || LINEAR || EOS || align=right | 4.6 km || 
|-id=516 bgcolor=#d6d6d6
| 43516 ||  || — || February 17, 2001 || Socorro || LINEAR || — || align=right | 3.5 km || 
|-id=517 bgcolor=#d6d6d6
| 43517 ||  || — || February 19, 2001 || Oizumi || T. Kobayashi || — || align=right | 7.8 km || 
|-id=518 bgcolor=#d6d6d6
| 43518 ||  || — || February 16, 2001 || Socorro || LINEAR || — || align=right | 5.8 km || 
|-id=519 bgcolor=#d6d6d6
| 43519 ||  || — || February 16, 2001 || Socorro || LINEAR || — || align=right | 7.7 km || 
|-id=520 bgcolor=#d6d6d6
| 43520 ||  || — || February 16, 2001 || Socorro || LINEAR || — || align=right | 4.5 km || 
|-id=521 bgcolor=#d6d6d6
| 43521 ||  || — || February 16, 2001 || Socorro || LINEAR || — || align=right | 7.3 km || 
|-id=522 bgcolor=#d6d6d6
| 43522 ||  || — || February 16, 2001 || Socorro || LINEAR || — || align=right | 9.1 km || 
|-id=523 bgcolor=#d6d6d6
| 43523 ||  || — || February 16, 2001 || Socorro || LINEAR || — || align=right | 11 km || 
|-id=524 bgcolor=#fefefe
| 43524 ||  || — || February 17, 2001 || Socorro || LINEAR || — || align=right | 2.8 km || 
|-id=525 bgcolor=#d6d6d6
| 43525 ||  || — || February 17, 2001 || Socorro || LINEAR || — || align=right | 6.7 km || 
|-id=526 bgcolor=#E9E9E9
| 43526 ||  || — || February 19, 2001 || Socorro || LINEAR || — || align=right | 3.5 km || 
|-id=527 bgcolor=#d6d6d6
| 43527 ||  || — || February 16, 2001 || Socorro || LINEAR || — || align=right | 9.4 km || 
|-id=528 bgcolor=#E9E9E9
| 43528 ||  || — || February 19, 2001 || Socorro || LINEAR || — || align=right | 3.9 km || 
|-id=529 bgcolor=#E9E9E9
| 43529 ||  || — || February 19, 2001 || Socorro || LINEAR || — || align=right | 3.7 km || 
|-id=530 bgcolor=#d6d6d6
| 43530 ||  || — || February 19, 2001 || Socorro || LINEAR || — || align=right | 9.5 km || 
|-id=531 bgcolor=#E9E9E9
| 43531 ||  || — || February 19, 2001 || Socorro || LINEAR || EUN || align=right | 3.9 km || 
|-id=532 bgcolor=#d6d6d6
| 43532 ||  || — || February 19, 2001 || Socorro || LINEAR || — || align=right | 9.0 km || 
|-id=533 bgcolor=#fefefe
| 43533 ||  || — || February 19, 2001 || Socorro || LINEAR || FLO || align=right | 3.5 km || 
|-id=534 bgcolor=#d6d6d6
| 43534 ||  || — || February 16, 2001 || Socorro || LINEAR || — || align=right | 8.9 km || 
|-id=535 bgcolor=#d6d6d6
| 43535 ||  || — || February 17, 2001 || Socorro || LINEAR || 7:4 || align=right | 7.2 km || 
|-id=536 bgcolor=#d6d6d6
| 43536 ||  || — || February 22, 2001 || Kitt Peak || Spacewatch || — || align=right | 5.5 km || 
|-id=537 bgcolor=#E9E9E9
| 43537 ||  || — || March 1, 2001 || Socorro || LINEAR || GER || align=right | 6.8 km || 
|-id=538 bgcolor=#d6d6d6
| 43538 ||  || — || March 2, 2001 || Anderson Mesa || LONEOS || — || align=right | 9.7 km || 
|-id=539 bgcolor=#E9E9E9
| 43539 ||  || — || March 3, 2001 || Socorro || LINEAR || — || align=right | 4.1 km || 
|-id=540 bgcolor=#d6d6d6
| 43540 ||  || — || March 15, 2001 || Socorro || LINEAR || EOS || align=right | 5.6 km || 
|-id=541 bgcolor=#E9E9E9
| 43541 ||  || — || March 15, 2001 || Kitt Peak || Spacewatch || — || align=right | 2.6 km || 
|-id=542 bgcolor=#E9E9E9
| 43542 ||  || — || March 2, 2001 || Anderson Mesa || LONEOS || — || align=right | 5.9 km || 
|-id=543 bgcolor=#d6d6d6
| 43543 ||  || — || March 18, 2001 || Socorro || LINEAR || — || align=right | 9.1 km || 
|-id=544 bgcolor=#d6d6d6
| 43544 ||  || — || March 18, 2001 || Socorro || LINEAR || HYG || align=right | 7.1 km || 
|-id=545 bgcolor=#d6d6d6
| 43545 ||  || — || March 18, 2001 || Socorro || LINEAR || — || align=right | 9.0 km || 
|-id=546 bgcolor=#d6d6d6
| 43546 ||  || — || March 18, 2001 || Socorro || LINEAR || — || align=right | 10 km || 
|-id=547 bgcolor=#d6d6d6
| 43547 ||  || — || March 19, 2001 || Anderson Mesa || LONEOS || ALA || align=right | 8.7 km || 
|-id=548 bgcolor=#E9E9E9
| 43548 ||  || — || March 19, 2001 || Anderson Mesa || LONEOS || — || align=right | 2.6 km || 
|-id=549 bgcolor=#d6d6d6
| 43549 ||  || — || March 19, 2001 || Anderson Mesa || LONEOS || KOR || align=right | 3.7 km || 
|-id=550 bgcolor=#d6d6d6
| 43550 ||  || — || March 17, 2001 || Socorro || LINEAR || — || align=right | 8.9 km || 
|-id=551 bgcolor=#d6d6d6
| 43551 ||  || — || March 19, 2001 || Socorro || LINEAR || — || align=right | 11 km || 
|-id=552 bgcolor=#E9E9E9
| 43552 ||  || — || March 18, 2001 || Socorro || LINEAR || TIN || align=right | 2.4 km || 
|-id=553 bgcolor=#E9E9E9
| 43553 ||  || — || March 18, 2001 || Socorro || LINEAR || — || align=right | 5.8 km || 
|-id=554 bgcolor=#d6d6d6
| 43554 ||  || — || March 18, 2001 || Socorro || LINEAR || — || align=right | 5.1 km || 
|-id=555 bgcolor=#d6d6d6
| 43555 ||  || — || March 19, 2001 || Socorro || LINEAR || EOS || align=right | 6.0 km || 
|-id=556 bgcolor=#d6d6d6
| 43556 ||  || — || March 19, 2001 || Socorro || LINEAR || — || align=right | 6.0 km || 
|-id=557 bgcolor=#fefefe
| 43557 ||  || — || March 19, 2001 || Socorro || LINEAR || NYS || align=right | 1.8 km || 
|-id=558 bgcolor=#d6d6d6
| 43558 ||  || — || March 19, 2001 || Socorro || LINEAR || EOS || align=right | 5.2 km || 
|-id=559 bgcolor=#d6d6d6
| 43559 ||  || — || March 19, 2001 || Socorro || LINEAR || — || align=right | 7.1 km || 
|-id=560 bgcolor=#fefefe
| 43560 ||  || — || March 19, 2001 || Socorro || LINEAR || — || align=right | 7.5 km || 
|-id=561 bgcolor=#d6d6d6
| 43561 ||  || — || March 21, 2001 || Socorro || LINEAR || EOS || align=right | 6.8 km || 
|-id=562 bgcolor=#d6d6d6
| 43562 ||  || — || March 16, 2001 || Socorro || LINEAR || — || align=right | 6.7 km || 
|-id=563 bgcolor=#E9E9E9
| 43563 ||  || — || March 17, 2001 || Socorro || LINEAR || — || align=right | 9.7 km || 
|-id=564 bgcolor=#d6d6d6
| 43564 ||  || — || March 18, 2001 || Socorro || LINEAR || — || align=right | 5.6 km || 
|-id=565 bgcolor=#E9E9E9
| 43565 ||  || — || March 18, 2001 || Socorro || LINEAR || — || align=right | 2.8 km || 
|-id=566 bgcolor=#E9E9E9
| 43566 ||  || — || March 19, 2001 || Socorro || LINEAR || ADE || align=right | 6.5 km || 
|-id=567 bgcolor=#d6d6d6
| 43567 ||  || — || March 26, 2001 || Socorro || LINEAR || EOS || align=right | 5.2 km || 
|-id=568 bgcolor=#d6d6d6
| 43568 ||  || — || March 21, 2001 || Anderson Mesa || LONEOS || — || align=right | 8.4 km || 
|-id=569 bgcolor=#E9E9E9
| 43569 ||  || — || March 23, 2001 || Haleakala || NEAT || — || align=right | 3.9 km || 
|-id=570 bgcolor=#fefefe
| 43570 ||  || — || March 24, 2001 || Anderson Mesa || LONEOS || PHO || align=right | 3.9 km || 
|-id=571 bgcolor=#E9E9E9
| 43571 ||  || — || March 19, 2001 || Anderson Mesa || LONEOS || GER || align=right | 4.3 km || 
|-id=572 bgcolor=#fefefe
| 43572 ||  || — || March 19, 2001 || Socorro || LINEAR || — || align=right | 2.1 km || 
|-id=573 bgcolor=#d6d6d6
| 43573 ||  || — || March 23, 2001 || Anderson Mesa || LONEOS || — || align=right | 7.0 km || 
|-id=574 bgcolor=#E9E9E9
| 43574 Joyharjo ||  ||  || March 26, 2001 || Kitt Peak || M. W. Buie || — || align=right | 4.7 km || 
|-id=575 bgcolor=#d6d6d6
| 43575 ||  || — || April 14, 2001 || Haleakala || NEAT || — || align=right | 4.5 km || 
|-id=576 bgcolor=#E9E9E9
| 43576 ||  || — || April 27, 2001 || Socorro || LINEAR || — || align=right | 2.8 km || 
|-id=577 bgcolor=#E9E9E9
| 43577 ||  || — || April 29, 2001 || Socorro || LINEAR || — || align=right | 5.1 km || 
|-id=578 bgcolor=#E9E9E9
| 43578 ||  || — || May 18, 2001 || Socorro || LINEAR || — || align=right | 3.2 km || 
|-id=579 bgcolor=#fefefe
| 43579 ||  || — || May 17, 2001 || Socorro || LINEAR || — || align=right | 1.6 km || 
|-id=580 bgcolor=#E9E9E9
| 43580 ||  || — || May 22, 2001 || Socorro || LINEAR || — || align=right | 4.7 km || 
|-id=581 bgcolor=#E9E9E9
| 43581 ||  || — || May 18, 2001 || Anderson Mesa || LONEOS || — || align=right | 3.5 km || 
|-id=582 bgcolor=#E9E9E9
| 43582 ||  || — || May 26, 2001 || Socorro || LINEAR || — || align=right | 4.4 km || 
|-id=583 bgcolor=#fefefe
| 43583 ||  || — || May 26, 2001 || Socorro || LINEAR || — || align=right | 2.7 km || 
|-id=584 bgcolor=#fefefe
| 43584 ||  || — || May 30, 2001 || Socorro || LINEAR || PHO || align=right | 2.8 km || 
|-id=585 bgcolor=#E9E9E9
| 43585 ||  || — || June 15, 2001 || Socorro || LINEAR || — || align=right | 3.6 km || 
|-id=586 bgcolor=#fefefe
| 43586 ||  || — || July 19, 2001 || Haleakala || NEAT || V || align=right | 2.0 km || 
|-id=587 bgcolor=#fefefe
| 43587 ||  || — || August 8, 2001 || Haleakala || NEAT || NYS || align=right | 1.8 km || 
|-id=588 bgcolor=#fefefe
| 43588 ||  || — || August 14, 2001 || Reedy Creek || J. Broughton || NYS || align=right | 1.7 km || 
|-id=589 bgcolor=#fefefe
| 43589 || 2001 QW || — || August 16, 2001 || Socorro || LINEAR || NYS || align=right | 1.9 km || 
|-id=590 bgcolor=#fefefe
| 43590 ||  || — || August 16, 2001 || Socorro || LINEAR || — || align=right | 2.4 km || 
|-id=591 bgcolor=#fefefe
| 43591 ||  || — || August 16, 2001 || Socorro || LINEAR || — || align=right | 2.1 km || 
|-id=592 bgcolor=#d6d6d6
| 43592 ||  || — || August 20, 2001 || Oakley || C. Wolfe || — || align=right | 15 km || 
|-id=593 bgcolor=#fefefe
| 43593 ||  || — || August 16, 2001 || Socorro || LINEAR || FLO || align=right | 1.9 km || 
|-id=594 bgcolor=#fefefe
| 43594 ||  || — || August 18, 2001 || Socorro || LINEAR || — || align=right | 2.6 km || 
|-id=595 bgcolor=#E9E9E9
| 43595 ||  || — || August 18, 2001 || Socorro || LINEAR || — || align=right | 8.3 km || 
|-id=596 bgcolor=#d6d6d6
| 43596 ||  || — || August 20, 2001 || Socorro || LINEAR || — || align=right | 6.9 km || 
|-id=597 bgcolor=#fefefe
| 43597 Changshaopo ||  ||  || August 31, 2001 || Desert Eagle || W. K. Y. Yeung || — || align=right | 1.9 km || 
|-id=598 bgcolor=#E9E9E9
| 43598 ||  || — || August 22, 2001 || Socorro || LINEAR || EUN || align=right | 3.8 km || 
|-id=599 bgcolor=#E9E9E9
| 43599 ||  || — || August 25, 2001 || Socorro || LINEAR || — || align=right | 7.7 km || 
|-id=600 bgcolor=#fefefe
| 43600 ||  || — || September 7, 2001 || Socorro || LINEAR || — || align=right | 2.0 km || 
|}

43601–43700 

|-bgcolor=#E9E9E9
| 43601 ||  || — || September 17, 2001 || Socorro || LINEAR || — || align=right | 6.3 km || 
|-id=602 bgcolor=#d6d6d6
| 43602 ||  || — || September 25, 2001 || Socorro || LINEAR || — || align=right | 10 km || 
|-id=603 bgcolor=#E9E9E9
| 43603 ||  || — || October 24, 2001 || Desert Eagle || W. K. Y. Yeung || — || align=right | 4.9 km || 
|-id=604 bgcolor=#E9E9E9
| 43604 ||  || — || November 10, 2001 || Socorro || LINEAR || — || align=right | 4.4 km || 
|-id=605 bgcolor=#E9E9E9
| 43605 Gakuho ||  ||  || November 25, 2001 || Bisei SG Center || BATTeRS || — || align=right | 3.2 km || 
|-id=606 bgcolor=#fefefe
| 43606 ||  || — || December 8, 2001 || Socorro || LINEAR || H || align=right | 2.2 km || 
|-id=607 bgcolor=#E9E9E9
| 43607 ||  || — || December 10, 2001 || Socorro || LINEAR || EUN || align=right | 5.8 km || 
|-id=608 bgcolor=#fefefe
| 43608 ||  || — || December 10, 2001 || Socorro || LINEAR || FLO || align=right | 2.5 km || 
|-id=609 bgcolor=#fefefe
| 43609 ||  || — || December 11, 2001 || Socorro || LINEAR || V || align=right | 1.7 km || 
|-id=610 bgcolor=#d6d6d6
| 43610 ||  || — || December 14, 2001 || Socorro || LINEAR || — || align=right | 6.6 km || 
|-id=611 bgcolor=#d6d6d6
| 43611 ||  || — || January 14, 2002 || Desert Eagle || W. K. Y. Yeung || — || align=right | 6.8 km || 
|-id=612 bgcolor=#d6d6d6
| 43612 ||  || — || January 13, 2002 || Socorro || LINEAR || — || align=right | 7.4 km || 
|-id=613 bgcolor=#d6d6d6
| 43613 ||  || — || January 14, 2002 || Socorro || LINEAR || EOS || align=right | 6.2 km || 
|-id=614 bgcolor=#E9E9E9
| 43614 ||  || — || January 8, 2002 || Haleakala || NEAT || — || align=right | 3.3 km || 
|-id=615 bgcolor=#d6d6d6
| 43615 ||  || — || January 12, 2002 || Socorro || LINEAR || — || align=right | 6.4 km || 
|-id=616 bgcolor=#E9E9E9
| 43616 ||  || — || February 6, 2002 || Socorro || LINEAR || HNA || align=right | 5.8 km || 
|-id=617 bgcolor=#d6d6d6
| 43617 ||  || — || February 12, 2002 || Fountain Hills || C. W. Juels, P. R. Holvorcem || ALA || align=right | 10 km || 
|-id=618 bgcolor=#d6d6d6
| 43618 ||  || — || February 7, 2002 || Socorro || LINEAR || THM || align=right | 6.7 km || 
|-id=619 bgcolor=#fefefe
| 43619 ||  || — || February 7, 2002 || Socorro || LINEAR || FLO || align=right | 2.1 km || 
|-id=620 bgcolor=#E9E9E9
| 43620 ||  || — || February 7, 2002 || Socorro || LINEAR || — || align=right | 2.8 km || 
|-id=621 bgcolor=#E9E9E9
| 43621 ||  || — || February 9, 2002 || Anderson Mesa || LONEOS || — || align=right | 3.9 km || 
|-id=622 bgcolor=#d6d6d6
| 43622 ||  || — || February 7, 2002 || Socorro || LINEAR || — || align=right | 3.8 km || 
|-id=623 bgcolor=#fefefe
| 43623 ||  || — || February 8, 2002 || Socorro || LINEAR || FLO || align=right | 1.2 km || 
|-id=624 bgcolor=#fefefe
| 43624 ||  || — || February 9, 2002 || Socorro || LINEAR || — || align=right | 2.0 km || 
|-id=625 bgcolor=#d6d6d6
| 43625 ||  || — || February 8, 2002 || Socorro || LINEAR || LIX || align=right | 9.8 km || 
|-id=626 bgcolor=#E9E9E9
| 43626 ||  || — || February 8, 2002 || Socorro || LINEAR || — || align=right | 4.8 km || 
|-id=627 bgcolor=#C2FFFF
| 43627 ||  || — || February 11, 2002 || Socorro || LINEAR || L4 || align=right | 14 km || 
|-id=628 bgcolor=#d6d6d6
| 43628 ||  || — || February 11, 2002 || Socorro || LINEAR || LIX || align=right | 12 km || 
|-id=629 bgcolor=#fefefe
| 43629 ||  || — || February 7, 2002 || Kitt Peak || Spacewatch || V || align=right | 1.9 km || 
|-id=630 bgcolor=#E9E9E9
| 43630 ||  || — || February 13, 2002 || Palomar || NEAT || — || align=right | 3.7 km || 
|-id=631 bgcolor=#d6d6d6
| 43631 ||  || — || February 8, 2002 || Socorro || LINEAR || EOS || align=right | 5.4 km || 
|-id=632 bgcolor=#fefefe
| 43632 ||  || — || February 11, 2002 || Socorro || LINEAR || FLO || align=right | 1.9 km || 
|-id=633 bgcolor=#fefefe
| 43633 ||  || — || February 15, 2002 || Socorro || LINEAR || NYS || align=right | 1.7 km || 
|-id=634 bgcolor=#fefefe
| 43634 ||  || — || March 14, 2002 || Socorro || LINEAR || H || align=right | 1.6 km || 
|-id=635 bgcolor=#fefefe
| 43635 ||  || — || March 9, 2002 || Palomar || NEAT || V || align=right | 1.7 km || 
|-id=636 bgcolor=#fefefe
| 43636 ||  || — || March 10, 2002 || Haleakala || NEAT || FLO || align=right | 1.7 km || 
|-id=637 bgcolor=#d6d6d6
| 43637 ||  || — || March 9, 2002 || Socorro || LINEAR || LIX || align=right | 10 km || 
|-id=638 bgcolor=#E9E9E9
| 43638 ||  || — || March 9, 2002 || Socorro || LINEAR || AER || align=right | 2.9 km || 
|-id=639 bgcolor=#d6d6d6
| 43639 ||  || — || March 9, 2002 || Socorro || LINEAR || — || align=right | 5.3 km || 
|-id=640 bgcolor=#d6d6d6
| 43640 ||  || — || March 11, 2002 || Palomar || NEAT || — || align=right | 9.0 km || 
|-id=641 bgcolor=#d6d6d6
| 43641 ||  || — || March 9, 2002 || Socorro || LINEAR || — || align=right | 6.8 km || 
|-id=642 bgcolor=#d6d6d6
| 43642 ||  || — || March 9, 2002 || Socorro || LINEAR || ALA || align=right | 6.2 km || 
|-id=643 bgcolor=#E9E9E9
| 43643 ||  || — || March 12, 2002 || Kitt Peak || Spacewatch || — || align=right | 2.9 km || 
|-id=644 bgcolor=#E9E9E9
| 43644 ||  || — || March 13, 2002 || Socorro || LINEAR || — || align=right | 2.0 km || 
|-id=645 bgcolor=#E9E9E9
| 43645 ||  || — || March 13, 2002 || Socorro || LINEAR || — || align=right | 3.6 km || 
|-id=646 bgcolor=#E9E9E9
| 43646 ||  || — || March 13, 2002 || Socorro || LINEAR || — || align=right | 3.2 km || 
|-id=647 bgcolor=#d6d6d6
| 43647 ||  || — || March 13, 2002 || Socorro || LINEAR || HYG || align=right | 7.7 km || 
|-id=648 bgcolor=#d6d6d6
| 43648 ||  || — || March 11, 2002 || Kitt Peak || Spacewatch || KOR || align=right | 3.3 km || 
|-id=649 bgcolor=#fefefe
| 43649 ||  || — || March 9, 2002 || Socorro || LINEAR || V || align=right | 2.0 km || 
|-id=650 bgcolor=#fefefe
| 43650 ||  || — || March 9, 2002 || Socorro || LINEAR || V || align=right | 1.9 km || 
|-id=651 bgcolor=#d6d6d6
| 43651 ||  || — || March 9, 2002 || Socorro || LINEAR || — || align=right | 6.0 km || 
|-id=652 bgcolor=#d6d6d6
| 43652 ||  || — || March 9, 2002 || Socorro || LINEAR || — || align=right | 6.1 km || 
|-id=653 bgcolor=#fefefe
| 43653 ||  || — || March 13, 2002 || Socorro || LINEAR || — || align=right | 5.2 km || 
|-id=654 bgcolor=#E9E9E9
| 43654 ||  || — || March 12, 2002 || Socorro || LINEAR || — || align=right | 4.8 km || 
|-id=655 bgcolor=#E9E9E9
| 43655 ||  || — || March 15, 2002 || Socorro || LINEAR || — || align=right | 3.4 km || 
|-id=656 bgcolor=#fefefe
| 43656 ||  || — || March 9, 2002 || Socorro || LINEAR || — || align=right | 3.6 km || 
|-id=657 bgcolor=#d6d6d6
| 43657 Bobmiller ||  ||  || March 9, 2002 || Catalina || CSS || HYG || align=right | 6.2 km || 
|-id=658 bgcolor=#fefefe
| 43658 || 2002 FV || — || March 18, 2002 || Desert Eagle || W. K. Y. Yeung || FLO || align=right | 1.8 km || 
|-id=659 bgcolor=#fefefe
| 43659 ||  || — || March 18, 2002 || Desert Eagle || W. K. Y. Yeung || PHO || align=right | 3.3 km || 
|-id=660 bgcolor=#fefefe
| 43660 ||  || — || March 19, 2002 || Desert Eagle || W. K. Y. Yeung || NYS || align=right | 1.6 km || 
|-id=661 bgcolor=#E9E9E9
| 43661 ||  || — || March 19, 2002 || Desert Eagle || W. K. Y. Yeung || — || align=right | 2.5 km || 
|-id=662 bgcolor=#fefefe
| 43662 ||  || — || March 16, 2002 || Socorro || LINEAR || — || align=right | 2.3 km || 
|-id=663 bgcolor=#fefefe
| 43663 ||  || — || March 17, 2002 || Socorro || LINEAR || FLO || align=right | 2.7 km || 
|-id=664 bgcolor=#d6d6d6
| 43664 ||  || — || March 16, 2002 || Anderson Mesa || LONEOS || ALA || align=right | 10 km || 
|-id=665 bgcolor=#E9E9E9
| 43665 ||  || — || March 19, 2002 || Socorro || LINEAR || — || align=right | 3.3 km || 
|-id=666 bgcolor=#d6d6d6
| 43666 ||  || — || March 20, 2002 || Anderson Mesa || LONEOS || — || align=right | 6.8 km || 
|-id=667 bgcolor=#fefefe
| 43667 Dumlupınar ||  ||  || April 4, 2002 || Haleakala || NEAT || — || align=right | 2.5 km || 
|-id=668 bgcolor=#E9E9E9
| 43668 ||  || — || April 14, 2002 || Desert Eagle || W. K. Y. Yeung || GEF || align=right | 3.9 km || 
|-id=669 bgcolor=#E9E9E9
| 43669 Winterthur ||  ||  || April 15, 2002 || Winterthur || M. Griesser || EUN || align=right | 2.4 km || 
|-id=670 bgcolor=#E9E9E9
| 43670 ||  || — || April 14, 2002 || Socorro || LINEAR || — || align=right | 2.9 km || 
|-id=671 bgcolor=#fefefe
| 43671 ||  || — || April 15, 2002 || Socorro || LINEAR || — || align=right | 1.4 km || 
|-id=672 bgcolor=#E9E9E9
| 43672 ||  || — || April 15, 2002 || Socorro || LINEAR || — || align=right | 2.8 km || 
|-id=673 bgcolor=#fefefe
| 43673 ||  || — || April 15, 2002 || Socorro || LINEAR || — || align=right | 2.0 km || 
|-id=674 bgcolor=#fefefe
| 43674 ||  || — || April 14, 2002 || Socorro || LINEAR || — || align=right | 4.3 km || 
|-id=675 bgcolor=#fefefe
| 43675 ||  || — || April 14, 2002 || Socorro || LINEAR || NYS || align=right | 1.2 km || 
|-id=676 bgcolor=#fefefe
| 43676 ||  || — || April 14, 2002 || Haleakala || NEAT || — || align=right | 2.1 km || 
|-id=677 bgcolor=#fefefe
| 43677 || 2002 HN || — || April 16, 2002 || Desert Eagle || W. K. Y. Yeung || — || align=right | 2.5 km || 
|-id=678 bgcolor=#fefefe
| 43678 || 2002 HP || — || April 16, 2002 || Desert Eagle || W. K. Y. Yeung || — || align=right | 1.8 km || 
|-id=679 bgcolor=#fefefe
| 43679 ||  || — || April 16, 2002 || Socorro || LINEAR || — || align=right | 2.0 km || 
|-id=680 bgcolor=#E9E9E9
| 43680 ||  || — || April 18, 2002 || Desert Eagle || W. K. Y. Yeung || — || align=right | 2.8 km || 
|-id=681 bgcolor=#fefefe
| 43681 ||  || — || May 4, 2002 || Desert Eagle || W. K. Y. Yeung || FLO || align=right | 2.1 km || 
|-id=682 bgcolor=#fefefe
| 43682 ||  || — || May 3, 2002 || Palomar || NEAT || — || align=right | 1.8 km || 
|-id=683 bgcolor=#d6d6d6
| 43683 ||  || — || May 4, 2002 || Desert Eagle || W. K. Y. Yeung || — || align=right | 6.1 km || 
|-id=684 bgcolor=#E9E9E9
| 43684 ||  || — || May 8, 2002 || Socorro || LINEAR || — || align=right | 5.6 km || 
|-id=685 bgcolor=#E9E9E9
| 43685 ||  || — || May 8, 2002 || Socorro || LINEAR || — || align=right | 7.2 km || 
|-id=686 bgcolor=#E9E9E9
| 43686 ||  || — || May 8, 2002 || Socorro || LINEAR || — || align=right | 3.4 km || 
|-id=687 bgcolor=#fefefe
| 43687 ||  || — || May 9, 2002 || Socorro || LINEAR || FLO || align=right | 2.5 km || 
|-id=688 bgcolor=#fefefe
| 43688 ||  || — || May 8, 2002 || Socorro || LINEAR || V || align=right | 1.6 km || 
|-id=689 bgcolor=#E9E9E9
| 43689 ||  || — || May 8, 2002 || Socorro || LINEAR || — || align=right | 3.2 km || 
|-id=690 bgcolor=#fefefe
| 43690 ||  || — || May 8, 2002 || Socorro || LINEAR || — || align=right | 2.0 km || 
|-id=691 bgcolor=#E9E9E9
| 43691 ||  || — || May 11, 2002 || Socorro || LINEAR || HEN || align=right | 2.2 km || 
|-id=692 bgcolor=#fefefe
| 43692 || 2160 P-L || — || September 24, 1960 || Palomar || PLS || FLO || align=right | 1.8 km || 
|-id=693 bgcolor=#d6d6d6
| 43693 || 2731 P-L || — || September 24, 1960 || Palomar || PLS || — || align=right | 4.5 km || 
|-id=694 bgcolor=#fefefe
| 43694 || 2846 P-L || — || September 24, 1960 || Palomar || PLS || — || align=right | 2.1 km || 
|-id=695 bgcolor=#fefefe
| 43695 || 4079 P-L || — || September 24, 1960 || Palomar || PLS || — || align=right | 1.8 km || 
|-id=696 bgcolor=#fefefe
| 43696 || 4159 P-L || — || September 24, 1960 || Palomar || PLS || FLO || align=right | 2.0 km || 
|-id=697 bgcolor=#fefefe
| 43697 || 4620 P-L || — || September 24, 1960 || Palomar || PLS || FLO || align=right | 1.5 km || 
|-id=698 bgcolor=#E9E9E9
| 43698 || 4878 P-L || — || September 26, 1960 || Palomar || PLS || WIT || align=right | 4.6 km || 
|-id=699 bgcolor=#E9E9E9
| 43699 || 6586 P-L || — || September 24, 1960 || Palomar || PLS || ADE || align=right | 5.1 km || 
|-id=700 bgcolor=#E9E9E9
| 43700 || 6820 P-L || — || September 24, 1960 || Palomar || PLS || — || align=right | 2.9 km || 
|}

43701–43800 

|-bgcolor=#E9E9E9
| 43701 || 1115 T-1 || — || March 25, 1971 || Palomar || PLS || — || align=right | 3.6 km || 
|-id=702 bgcolor=#fefefe
| 43702 || 1142 T-1 || — || March 25, 1971 || Palomar || PLS || — || align=right | 2.0 km || 
|-id=703 bgcolor=#fefefe
| 43703 || 1276 T-1 || — || March 25, 1971 || Palomar || PLS || — || align=right | 2.0 km || 
|-id=704 bgcolor=#d6d6d6
| 43704 || 3225 T-1 || — || March 26, 1971 || Palomar || PLS || — || align=right | 6.5 km || 
|-id=705 bgcolor=#fefefe
| 43705 || 1131 T-2 || — || September 29, 1973 || Palomar || PLS || NYS || align=right | 1.6 km || 
|-id=706 bgcolor=#C2FFFF
| 43706 Iphiklos || 1416 T-2 ||  || September 29, 1973 || Palomar || PLS || L4 || align=right | 15 km || 
|-id=707 bgcolor=#fefefe
| 43707 || 2050 T-2 || — || September 29, 1973 || Palomar || PLS || NYS || align=right | 2.1 km || 
|-id=708 bgcolor=#fefefe
| 43708 || 2126 T-2 || — || September 29, 1973 || Palomar || PLS || — || align=right | 1.6 km || 
|-id=709 bgcolor=#fefefe
| 43709 || 2284 T-2 || — || September 29, 1973 || Palomar || PLS || — || align=right | 1.9 km || 
|-id=710 bgcolor=#fefefe
| 43710 || 2907 T-2 || — || September 30, 1973 || Palomar || PLS || — || align=right | 2.3 km || 
|-id=711 bgcolor=#fefefe
| 43711 || 3005 T-2 || — || September 30, 1973 || Palomar || PLS || — || align=right | 2.1 km || 
|-id=712 bgcolor=#E9E9E9
| 43712 || 5054 T-2 || — || September 25, 1973 || Palomar || PLS || — || align=right | 3.2 km || 
|-id=713 bgcolor=#d6d6d6
| 43713 || 5104 T-2 || — || September 25, 1973 || Palomar || PLS || — || align=right | 3.7 km || 
|-id=714 bgcolor=#fefefe
| 43714 || 1048 T-3 || — || October 17, 1977 || Palomar || PLS || — || align=right | 5.2 km || 
|-id=715 bgcolor=#d6d6d6
| 43715 || 1084 T-3 || — || October 17, 1977 || Palomar || PLS || EOS || align=right | 6.4 km || 
|-id=716 bgcolor=#E9E9E9
| 43716 || 1096 T-3 || — || October 17, 1977 || Palomar || PLS || ADE || align=right | 6.9 km || 
|-id=717 bgcolor=#fefefe
| 43717 || 2023 T-3 || — || October 16, 1977 || Palomar || PLS || — || align=right | 1.5 km || 
|-id=718 bgcolor=#d6d6d6
| 43718 || 2208 T-3 || — || October 16, 1977 || Palomar || PLS || EOS || align=right | 4.5 km || 
|-id=719 bgcolor=#fefefe
| 43719 || 2666 T-3 || — || October 11, 1977 || Palomar || PLS || — || align=right | 3.3 km || 
|-id=720 bgcolor=#E9E9E9
| 43720 || 4301 T-3 || — || October 16, 1977 || Palomar || PLS || HOF || align=right | 5.2 km || 
|-id=721 bgcolor=#d6d6d6
| 43721 || 4433 T-3 || — || October 16, 1977 || Palomar || PLS || — || align=right | 8.1 km || 
|-id=722 bgcolor=#d6d6d6
| 43722 Carloseduardo || 1968 OB ||  || July 18, 1968 || Cerro El Roble || C. Torres, S. Cofré || — || align=right | 13 km || 
|-id=723 bgcolor=#fefefe
| 43723 ||  || — || September 30, 1975 || Palomar || S. J. Bus || — || align=right | 2.8 km || 
|-id=724 bgcolor=#fefefe
| 43724 Pechstein || 1975 UY ||  || October 29, 1975 || Tautenburg Observatory || F. Börngen || — || align=right | 2.9 km || 
|-id=725 bgcolor=#fefefe
| 43725 ||  || — || September 2, 1978 || La Silla || C.-I. Lagerkvist || — || align=right | 4.1 km || 
|-id=726 bgcolor=#fefefe
| 43726 ||  || — || October 27, 1978 || Palomar || C. M. Olmstead || — || align=right | 2.2 km || 
|-id=727 bgcolor=#fefefe
| 43727 ||  || — || June 25, 1979 || Siding Spring || E. F. Helin, S. J. Bus || — || align=right | 2.3 km || 
|-id=728 bgcolor=#fefefe
| 43728 ||  || — || June 25, 1979 || Siding Spring || E. F. Helin, S. J. Bus || — || align=right | 2.5 km || 
|-id=729 bgcolor=#d6d6d6
| 43729 ||  || — || June 25, 1979 || Siding Spring || E. F. Helin, S. J. Bus || HYG || align=right | 6.3 km || 
|-id=730 bgcolor=#fefefe
| 43730 ||  || — || June 25, 1979 || Siding Spring || E. F. Helin, S. J. Bus || — || align=right | 1.4 km || 
|-id=731 bgcolor=#E9E9E9
| 43731 ||  || — || June 25, 1979 || Siding Spring || E. F. Helin, S. J. Bus || NEM || align=right | 3.8 km || 
|-id=732 bgcolor=#d6d6d6
| 43732 ||  || — || June 25, 1979 || Siding Spring || E. F. Helin, S. J. Bus || — || align=right | 8.1 km || 
|-id=733 bgcolor=#d6d6d6
| 43733 ||  || — || June 25, 1979 || Siding Spring || E. F. Helin, S. J. Bus || HYG || align=right | 5.9 km || 
|-id=734 bgcolor=#E9E9E9
| 43734 ||  || — || June 25, 1979 || Siding Spring || E. F. Helin, S. J. Bus || GEF || align=right | 2.9 km || 
|-id=735 bgcolor=#E9E9E9
| 43735 ||  || — || February 28, 1981 || Siding Spring || S. J. Bus || — || align=right | 12 km || 
|-id=736 bgcolor=#fefefe
| 43736 ||  || — || February 28, 1981 || Siding Spring || S. J. Bus || — || align=right | 2.0 km || 
|-id=737 bgcolor=#E9E9E9
| 43737 ||  || — || March 2, 1981 || Siding Spring || S. J. Bus || — || align=right | 2.5 km || 
|-id=738 bgcolor=#E9E9E9
| 43738 ||  || — || March 7, 1981 || Siding Spring || S. J. Bus || MIT || align=right | 3.6 km || 
|-id=739 bgcolor=#fefefe
| 43739 ||  || — || March 1, 1981 || Siding Spring || S. J. Bus || V || align=right | 3.3 km || 
|-id=740 bgcolor=#fefefe
| 43740 ||  || — || March 1, 1981 || Siding Spring || S. J. Bus || FLO || align=right | 1.8 km || 
|-id=741 bgcolor=#fefefe
| 43741 ||  || — || March 1, 1981 || Siding Spring || S. J. Bus || FLO || align=right | 1.7 km || 
|-id=742 bgcolor=#E9E9E9
| 43742 ||  || — || March 1, 1981 || Siding Spring || S. J. Bus || — || align=right | 6.1 km || 
|-id=743 bgcolor=#fefefe
| 43743 ||  || — || March 1, 1981 || Siding Spring || S. J. Bus || V || align=right | 1.9 km || 
|-id=744 bgcolor=#fefefe
| 43744 ||  || — || March 2, 1981 || Siding Spring || S. J. Bus || NYS || align=right | 3.4 km || 
|-id=745 bgcolor=#E9E9E9
| 43745 ||  || — || March 2, 1981 || Siding Spring || S. J. Bus || — || align=right | 2.4 km || 
|-id=746 bgcolor=#fefefe
| 43746 ||  || — || March 2, 1981 || Siding Spring || S. J. Bus || — || align=right | 2.3 km || 
|-id=747 bgcolor=#E9E9E9
| 43747 ||  || — || March 2, 1981 || Siding Spring || S. J. Bus || — || align=right | 5.6 km || 
|-id=748 bgcolor=#fefefe
| 43748 ||  || — || March 1, 1981 || Siding Spring || S. J. Bus || — || align=right | 1.8 km || 
|-id=749 bgcolor=#E9E9E9
| 43749 ||  || — || March 2, 1981 || Siding Spring || S. J. Bus || — || align=right | 1.7 km || 
|-id=750 bgcolor=#E9E9E9
| 43750 ||  || — || August 25, 1981 || La Silla || H. Debehogne || — || align=right | 5.2 km || 
|-id=751 bgcolor=#E9E9E9
| 43751 Asam ||  ||  || October 19, 1982 || Tautenburg Observatory || F. Börngen || — || align=right | 3.3 km || 
|-id=752 bgcolor=#fefefe
| 43752 Maryosipova ||  ||  || October 20, 1982 || Nauchnij || L. G. Karachkina || — || align=right | 2.6 km || 
|-id=753 bgcolor=#E9E9E9
| 43753 ||  || — || November 14, 1982 || Kiso || H. Kosai, K. Furukawa || — || align=right | 2.6 km || 
|-id=754 bgcolor=#fefefe
| 43754 || 1983 AA || — || January 9, 1983 || Anderson Mesa || B. A. Skiff || PHO || align=right | 3.3 km || 
|-id=755 bgcolor=#fefefe
| 43755 ||  || — || September 5, 1983 || Harvard Observatory || Oak Ridge Observatory || NYS || align=right | 3.4 km || 
|-id=756 bgcolor=#E9E9E9
| 43756 || 1984 CE || — || February 10, 1984 || Palomar || J. Gibson || — || align=right | 7.0 km || 
|-id=757 bgcolor=#d6d6d6
| 43757 ||  || — || February 27, 1984 || La Silla || H. Debehogne || — || align=right | 12 km || 
|-id=758 bgcolor=#fefefe
| 43758 ||  || — || August 17, 1985 || Palomar || E. F. Helin || FLO || align=right | 3.0 km || 
|-id=759 bgcolor=#fefefe
| 43759 ||  || — || August 28, 1986 || La Silla || H. Debehogne || — || align=right | 2.1 km || 
|-id=760 bgcolor=#fefefe
| 43760 ||  || — || August 29, 1986 || La Silla || H. Debehogne || V || align=right | 2.1 km || 
|-id=761 bgcolor=#E9E9E9
| 43761 ||  || — || August 29, 1986 || La Silla || H. Debehogne || — || align=right | 7.6 km || 
|-id=762 bgcolor=#d6d6d6
| 43762 ||  || — || November 25, 1986 || Kleť || Z. Vávrová || THM || align=right | 7.8 km || 
|-id=763 bgcolor=#fefefe
| 43763 Russert ||  ||  || May 30, 1987 || Palomar || C. S. Shoemaker, E. M. Shoemaker || — || align=right | 5.6 km || 
|-id=764 bgcolor=#E9E9E9
| 43764 ||  || — || January 28, 1988 || Siding Spring || R. H. McNaught || — || align=right | 3.5 km || 
|-id=765 bgcolor=#d6d6d6
| 43765 ||  || — || February 13, 1988 || La Silla || E. W. Elst || EOS || align=right | 6.3 km || 
|-id=766 bgcolor=#E9E9E9
| 43766 ||  || — || February 13, 1988 || La Silla || E. W. Elst || — || align=right | 7.2 km || 
|-id=767 bgcolor=#d6d6d6
| 43767 Permeke ||  ||  || February 13, 1988 || La Silla || E. W. Elst || — || align=right | 8.7 km || 
|-id=768 bgcolor=#d6d6d6
| 43768 Lynevans ||  ||  || February 15, 1988 || La Silla || E. W. Elst || — || align=right | 6.3 km || 
|-id=769 bgcolor=#E9E9E9
| 43769 || 1988 EK || — || March 10, 1988 || Palomar || J. Alu || — || align=right | 6.5 km || 
|-id=770 bgcolor=#d6d6d6
| 43770 ||  || — || March 13, 1988 || Brorfelde || P. Jensen || HYG || align=right | 7.2 km || 
|-id=771 bgcolor=#fefefe
| 43771 || 1988 TJ || — || October 3, 1988 || Kushiro || S. Ueda, H. Kaneda || — || align=right | 3.0 km || 
|-id=772 bgcolor=#fefefe
| 43772 ||  || — || October 13, 1988 || Kushiro || S. Ueda, H. Kaneda || — || align=right | 2.1 km || 
|-id=773 bgcolor=#E9E9E9
| 43773 || 1989 AJ || — || January 4, 1989 || Yorii || M. Arai, H. Mori || — || align=right | 9.0 km || 
|-id=774 bgcolor=#d6d6d6
| 43774 ||  || — || February 4, 1989 || La Silla || E. W. Elst || — || align=right | 7.4 km || 
|-id=775 bgcolor=#d6d6d6
| 43775 Tiepolo ||  ||  || February 2, 1989 || Tautenburg Observatory || F. Börngen || — || align=right | 11 km || 
|-id=776 bgcolor=#d6d6d6
| 43776 ||  || — || April 3, 1989 || La Silla || E. W. Elst || EOS || align=right | 5.6 km || 
|-id=777 bgcolor=#E9E9E9
| 43777 ||  || — || September 3, 1989 || Haute Provence || E. W. Elst || EUN || align=right | 3.9 km || 
|-id=778 bgcolor=#fefefe
| 43778 ||  || — || September 26, 1989 || La Silla || E. W. Elst || NYS || align=right | 2.5 km || 
|-id=779 bgcolor=#fefefe
| 43779 ||  || — || September 26, 1989 || La Silla || E. W. Elst || FLO || align=right | 2.3 km || 
|-id=780 bgcolor=#fefefe
| 43780 ||  || — || September 23, 1989 || La Silla || H. Debehogne || — || align=right | 4.6 km || 
|-id=781 bgcolor=#fefefe
| 43781 ||  || — || October 7, 1989 || La Silla || E. W. Elst || FLO || align=right data-sort-value="0.99" | 990 m || 
|-id=782 bgcolor=#E9E9E9
| 43782 ||  || — || October 29, 1989 || Okutama || T. Hioki, N. Kawasato || — || align=right | 6.2 km || 
|-id=783 bgcolor=#E9E9E9
| 43783 Svyatitelpyotr ||  ||  || October 24, 1989 || Nauchnij || L. I. Chernykh || — || align=right | 8.5 km || 
|-id=784 bgcolor=#E9E9E9
| 43784 ||  || — || December 2, 1989 || La Silla || E. W. Elst || — || align=right | 6.2 km || 
|-id=785 bgcolor=#fefefe
| 43785 ||  || — || December 29, 1989 || Haute Provence || E. W. Elst || FLO || align=right | 2.2 km || 
|-id=786 bgcolor=#E9E9E9
| 43786 ||  || — || August 16, 1990 || La Silla || E. W. Elst || — || align=right | 2.1 km || 
|-id=787 bgcolor=#E9E9E9
| 43787 ||  || — || August 16, 1990 || La Silla || E. W. Elst || — || align=right | 2.2 km || 
|-id=788 bgcolor=#E9E9E9
| 43788 ||  || — || September 14, 1990 || Palomar || H. E. Holt || GER || align=right | 3.9 km || 
|-id=789 bgcolor=#fefefe
| 43789 ||  || — || September 22, 1990 || La Silla || E. W. Elst || FLO || align=right | 1.9 km || 
|-id=790 bgcolor=#fefefe
| 43790 Ferdinandbraun ||  ||  || October 12, 1990 || Tautenburg Observatory || F. Börngen, L. D. Schmadel || — || align=right | 2.3 km || 
|-id=791 bgcolor=#E9E9E9
| 43791 ||  || — || October 16, 1990 || La Silla || E. W. Elst || — || align=right | 3.2 km || 
|-id=792 bgcolor=#E9E9E9
| 43792 ||  || — || November 11, 1990 || Geisei || T. Seki || — || align=right | 6.0 km || 
|-id=793 bgcolor=#E9E9E9
| 43793 Mackey ||  ||  || November 13, 1990 || Palomar || C. S. Shoemaker, D. H. Levy || — || align=right | 2.9 km || 
|-id=794 bgcolor=#E9E9E9
| 43794 Yabetakemoto || 1990 YP ||  || December 19, 1990 || Geisei || T. Seki || — || align=right | 3.6 km || 
|-id=795 bgcolor=#E9E9E9
| 43795 ||  || — || January 15, 1991 || Karasuyama || S. Inoda, T. Urata || — || align=right | 5.9 km || 
|-id=796 bgcolor=#E9E9E9
| 43796 ||  || — || January 14, 1991 || Palomar || E. F. Helin || BAR || align=right | 4.1 km || 
|-id=797 bgcolor=#E9E9E9
| 43797 ||  || — || January 7, 1991 || Siding Spring || R. H. McNaught || EUN || align=right | 3.9 km || 
|-id=798 bgcolor=#fefefe
| 43798 ||  || — || April 8, 1991 || La Silla || E. W. Elst || NYS || align=right | 1.2 km || 
|-id=799 bgcolor=#fefefe
| 43799 ||  || — || August 7, 1991 || Palomar || H. E. Holt || — || align=right | 3.1 km || 
|-id=800 bgcolor=#d6d6d6
| 43800 ||  || — || August 5, 1991 || Palomar || H. E. Holt || — || align=right | 7.8 km || 
|}

43801–43900 

|-bgcolor=#d6d6d6
| 43801 ||  || — || August 8, 1991 || Palomar || H. E. Holt || HYG || align=right | 8.0 km || 
|-id=802 bgcolor=#fefefe
| 43802 ||  || — || August 10, 1991 || Palomar || H. E. Holt || — || align=right | 2.6 km || 
|-id=803 bgcolor=#d6d6d6
| 43803 ||  || — || September 7, 1991 || Geisei || T. Seki || — || align=right | 6.6 km || 
|-id=804 bgcolor=#d6d6d6
| 43804 Peterting ||  ||  || September 10, 1991 || Tautenburg Observatory || L. D. Schmadel, F. Börngen || — || align=right | 9.3 km || 
|-id=805 bgcolor=#fefefe
| 43805 ||  || — || September 13, 1991 || Palomar || H. E. Holt || V || align=right | 3.2 km || 
|-id=806 bgcolor=#fefefe
| 43806 Augustepiccard ||  ||  || September 13, 1991 || Tautenburg Observatory || F. Börngen, L. D. Schmadel || — || align=right | 2.4 km || 
|-id=807 bgcolor=#d6d6d6
| 43807 ||  || — || September 13, 1991 || Palomar || H. E. Holt || slow || align=right | 13 km || 
|-id=808 bgcolor=#fefefe
| 43808 ||  || — || September 13, 1991 || Palomar || H. E. Holt || — || align=right | 2.5 km || 
|-id=809 bgcolor=#fefefe
| 43809 ||  || — || September 13, 1991 || Palomar || H. E. Holt || — || align=right | 4.3 km || 
|-id=810 bgcolor=#fefefe
| 43810 ||  || — || September 14, 1991 || Palomar || H. E. Holt || NYS || align=right | 1.9 km || 
|-id=811 bgcolor=#fefefe
| 43811 ||  || — || September 11, 1991 || Palomar || H. E. Holt || NYS || align=right | 2.1 km || 
|-id=812 bgcolor=#d6d6d6
| 43812 ||  || — || September 13, 1991 || Palomar || H. E. Holt || MEL || align=right | 16 km || 
|-id=813 bgcolor=#fefefe
| 43813 Kühner ||  ||  || October 7, 1991 || Tautenburg Observatory || L. D. Schmadel, F. Börngen || — || align=right | 2.5 km || 
|-id=814 bgcolor=#fefefe
| 43814 ||  || — || October 18, 1991 || Kushiro || S. Ueda, H. Kaneda || — || align=right | 2.5 km || 
|-id=815 bgcolor=#d6d6d6
| 43815 ||  || — || November 3, 1991 || Palomar || E. F. Helin || — || align=right | 14 km || 
|-id=816 bgcolor=#E9E9E9
| 43816 ||  || — || February 2, 1992 || La Silla || E. W. Elst || ADE || align=right | 3.8 km || 
|-id=817 bgcolor=#E9E9E9
| 43817 ||  || — || March 1, 1992 || La Silla || UESAC || — || align=right | 3.2 km || 
|-id=818 bgcolor=#d6d6d6
| 43818 ||  || — || March 2, 1992 || La Silla || UESAC || 3:2 || align=right | 11 km || 
|-id=819 bgcolor=#fefefe
| 43819 || 1992 LL || — || June 3, 1992 || Palomar || G. J. Leonard || FLO || align=right | 2.2 km || 
|-id=820 bgcolor=#fefefe
| 43820 ||  || — || August 8, 1992 || Caussols || E. W. Elst || — || align=right | 2.8 km || 
|-id=821 bgcolor=#fefefe
| 43821 ||  || — || September 2, 1992 || La Silla || E. W. Elst || FLO || align=right | 2.1 km || 
|-id=822 bgcolor=#fefefe
| 43822 ||  || — || September 2, 1992 || La Silla || E. W. Elst || — || align=right | 1.8 km || 
|-id=823 bgcolor=#E9E9E9
| 43823 ||  || — || September 29, 1992 || Palomar || H. E. Holt || — || align=right | 7.0 km || 
|-id=824 bgcolor=#d6d6d6
| 43824 ||  || — || September 30, 1992 || Palomar || H. E. Holt || EOS || align=right | 7.0 km || 
|-id=825 bgcolor=#fefefe
| 43825 ||  || — || October 25, 1992 || Okutama || T. Hioki, S. Hayakawa || — || align=right | 2.4 km || 
|-id=826 bgcolor=#fefefe
| 43826 ||  || — || October 28, 1992 || Kushiro || S. Ueda, H. Kaneda || — || align=right | 3.2 km || 
|-id=827 bgcolor=#fefefe
| 43827 ||  || — || January 27, 1993 || Caussols || E. W. Elst || — || align=right | 3.9 km || 
|-id=828 bgcolor=#E9E9E9
| 43828 ||  || — || March 17, 1993 || La Silla || UESAC || MRX || align=right | 6.0 km || 
|-id=829 bgcolor=#fefefe
| 43829 ||  || — || March 17, 1993 || La Silla || UESAC || — || align=right | 2.6 km || 
|-id=830 bgcolor=#E9E9E9
| 43830 ||  || — || March 21, 1993 || La Silla || UESAC || — || align=right | 3.4 km || 
|-id=831 bgcolor=#E9E9E9
| 43831 ||  || — || March 21, 1993 || La Silla || UESAC || EUN || align=right | 5.4 km || 
|-id=832 bgcolor=#E9E9E9
| 43832 ||  || — || March 19, 1993 || La Silla || UESAC || — || align=right | 2.3 km || 
|-id=833 bgcolor=#fefefe
| 43833 ||  || — || March 19, 1993 || La Silla || UESAC || FLO || align=right | 1.8 km || 
|-id=834 bgcolor=#E9E9E9
| 43834 ||  || — || March 19, 1993 || La Silla || UESAC || — || align=right | 2.0 km || 
|-id=835 bgcolor=#E9E9E9
| 43835 ||  || — || March 19, 1993 || La Silla || UESAC || — || align=right | 2.6 km || 
|-id=836 bgcolor=#E9E9E9
| 43836 ||  || — || March 19, 1993 || La Silla || UESAC || — || align=right | 3.6 km || 
|-id=837 bgcolor=#E9E9E9
| 43837 ||  || — || March 19, 1993 || La Silla || UESAC || — || align=right | 2.5 km || 
|-id=838 bgcolor=#E9E9E9
| 43838 ||  || — || March 19, 1993 || La Silla || UESAC || — || align=right | 2.8 km || 
|-id=839 bgcolor=#E9E9E9
| 43839 ||  || — || March 19, 1993 || La Silla || UESAC || JUN || align=right | 2.4 km || 
|-id=840 bgcolor=#E9E9E9
| 43840 ||  || — || March 21, 1993 || La Silla || UESAC || — || align=right | 2.4 km || 
|-id=841 bgcolor=#fefefe
| 43841 Marcustacitus || 1993 HB ||  || April 17, 1993 || Stroncone || Santa Lucia Obs. || MAS || align=right | 2.6 km || 
|-id=842 bgcolor=#E9E9E9
| 43842 || 1993 MR || — || June 26, 1993 || Farra d'Isonzo || Farra d'Isonzo || — || align=right | 2.7 km || 
|-id=843 bgcolor=#E9E9E9
| 43843 Cleynaerts ||  ||  || July 12, 1993 || La Silla || E. W. Elst || CLO || align=right | 5.5 km || 
|-id=844 bgcolor=#E9E9E9
| 43844 Rowling ||  ||  || July 25, 1993 || Manastash Ridge || M. Hammergren || MRX || align=right | 2.3 km || 
|-id=845 bgcolor=#fefefe
| 43845 ||  || — || July 20, 1993 || La Silla || E. W. Elst || — || align=right | 3.1 km || 
|-id=846 bgcolor=#E9E9E9
| 43846 ||  || — || August 15, 1993 || Caussols || E. W. Elst, C. Pollas || — || align=right | 3.4 km || 
|-id=847 bgcolor=#E9E9E9
| 43847 ||  || — || August 17, 1993 || Caussols || E. W. Elst || NEM || align=right | 5.9 km || 
|-id=848 bgcolor=#E9E9E9
| 43848 ||  || — || August 20, 1993 || La Silla || E. W. Elst || HOF || align=right | 5.8 km || 
|-id=849 bgcolor=#E9E9E9
| 43849 ||  || — || September 14, 1993 || La Silla || H. Debehogne, E. W. Elst || GEF || align=right | 3.3 km || 
|-id=850 bgcolor=#E9E9E9
| 43850 ||  || — || September 16, 1993 || La Silla || H. Debehogne, E. W. Elst || — || align=right | 5.5 km || 
|-id=851 bgcolor=#E9E9E9
| 43851 ||  || — || October 15, 1993 || Kitami || K. Endate, K. Watanabe || — || align=right | 2.8 km || 
|-id=852 bgcolor=#E9E9E9
| 43852 ||  || — || October 9, 1993 || La Silla || E. W. Elst || GEF || align=right | 3.5 km || 
|-id=853 bgcolor=#d6d6d6
| 43853 ||  || — || October 9, 1993 || La Silla || E. W. Elst || — || align=right | 8.6 km || 
|-id=854 bgcolor=#fefefe
| 43854 ||  || — || October 9, 1993 || La Silla || E. W. Elst || — || align=right | 3.6 km || 
|-id=855 bgcolor=#d6d6d6
| 43855 ||  || — || October 9, 1993 || La Silla || E. W. Elst || — || align=right | 8.3 km || 
|-id=856 bgcolor=#d6d6d6
| 43856 ||  || — || October 20, 1993 || La Silla || E. W. Elst || — || align=right | 4.9 km || 
|-id=857 bgcolor=#E9E9E9
| 43857 Tanijinzan ||  ||  || November 15, 1993 || Geisei || T. Seki || — || align=right | 13 km || 
|-id=858 bgcolor=#fefefe
| 43858 || 1994 AT || — || January 4, 1994 || Oizumi || T. Kobayashi || — || align=right | 1.7 km || 
|-id=859 bgcolor=#d6d6d6
| 43859 Naoyayano ||  ||  || January 9, 1994 || Oizumi || T. Kobayashi, H. Fujii || — || align=right | 9.6 km || 
|-id=860 bgcolor=#d6d6d6
| 43860 ||  || — || February 7, 1994 || La Silla || E. W. Elst || — || align=right | 12 km || 
|-id=861 bgcolor=#fefefe
| 43861 ||  || — || February 8, 1994 || La Silla || E. W. Elst || V || align=right | 1.8 km || 
|-id=862 bgcolor=#fefefe
| 43862 ||  || — || March 6, 1994 || Oizumi || T. Kobayashi || V || align=right | 2.9 km || 
|-id=863 bgcolor=#d6d6d6
| 43863 ||  || — || March 9, 1994 || Caussols || E. W. Elst || — || align=right | 11 km || 
|-id=864 bgcolor=#d6d6d6
| 43864 ||  || — || April 6, 1994 || Kitt Peak || Spacewatch || — || align=right | 4.2 km || 
|-id=865 bgcolor=#E9E9E9
| 43865 ||  || — || August 10, 1994 || La Silla || E. W. Elst || — || align=right | 2.1 km || 
|-id=866 bgcolor=#E9E9E9
| 43866 ||  || — || August 12, 1994 || La Silla || E. W. Elst || — || align=right | 2.5 km || 
|-id=867 bgcolor=#E9E9E9
| 43867 ||  || — || August 12, 1994 || La Silla || E. W. Elst || — || align=right | 2.3 km || 
|-id=868 bgcolor=#E9E9E9
| 43868 ||  || — || August 10, 1994 || La Silla || E. W. Elst || — || align=right | 2.5 km || 
|-id=869 bgcolor=#fefefe
| 43869 ||  || — || September 10, 1994 || Siding Spring || R. H. McNaught || H || align=right | 1.3 km || 
|-id=870 bgcolor=#E9E9E9
| 43870 || 1994 TX || — || October 2, 1994 || Kitami || K. Endate, K. Watanabe || — || align=right | 2.7 km || 
|-id=871 bgcolor=#E9E9E9
| 43871 ||  || — || October 13, 1994 || Dossobuono || Madonna di Dossobuono Obs. || — || align=right | 3.9 km || 
|-id=872 bgcolor=#E9E9E9
| 43872 ||  || — || October 28, 1994 || Kitt Peak || Spacewatch || — || align=right | 3.0 km || 
|-id=873 bgcolor=#E9E9E9
| 43873 || 1994 VD || — || November 1, 1994 || Oizumi || T. Kobayashi || ADE || align=right | 5.7 km || 
|-id=874 bgcolor=#E9E9E9
| 43874 ||  || — || November 7, 1994 || Kushiro || S. Ueda, H. Kaneda || — || align=right | 4.2 km || 
|-id=875 bgcolor=#E9E9E9
| 43875 ||  || — || November 24, 1994 || Kiyosato || S. Otomo || — || align=right | 5.4 km || 
|-id=876 bgcolor=#E9E9E9
| 43876 ||  || — || December 9, 1994 || Oizumi || T. Kobayashi || EUN || align=right | 4.7 km || 
|-id=877 bgcolor=#d6d6d6
| 43877 ||  || — || January 29, 1995 || Kitt Peak || Spacewatch || THM || align=right | 5.0 km || 
|-id=878 bgcolor=#d6d6d6
| 43878 ||  || — || January 29, 1995 || Kitt Peak || Spacewatch || KOR || align=right | 3.7 km || 
|-id=879 bgcolor=#d6d6d6
| 43879 ||  || — || February 1, 1995 || Kitt Peak || Spacewatch || — || align=right | 5.2 km || 
|-id=880 bgcolor=#fefefe
| 43880 ||  || — || February 2, 1995 || Kitt Peak || Spacewatch || — || align=right | 2.1 km || 
|-id=881 bgcolor=#fefefe
| 43881 Cerreto ||  ||  || February 25, 1995 || Cima Ekar || M. Tombelli, C. Casacci || — || align=right | 2.1 km || 
|-id=882 bgcolor=#fefefe
| 43882 Maurivicoli ||  ||  || March 7, 1995 || San Marcello || L. Tesi, A. Boattini || V || align=right | 1.6 km || 
|-id=883 bgcolor=#d6d6d6
| 43883 ||  || — || March 1, 1995 || Kitt Peak || Spacewatch || KOR || align=right | 2.8 km || 
|-id=884 bgcolor=#E9E9E9
| 43884 ||  || — || March 25, 1995 || Kitt Peak || Spacewatch || — || align=right | 3.8 km || 
|-id=885 bgcolor=#fefefe
| 43885 ||  || — || March 26, 1995 || Kitt Peak || Spacewatch || — || align=right | 2.8 km || 
|-id=886 bgcolor=#fefefe
| 43886 ||  || — || April 3, 1995 || Xinglong || SCAP || FLO || align=right | 1.4 km || 
|-id=887 bgcolor=#E9E9E9
| 43887 ||  || — || July 22, 1995 || Kitt Peak || Spacewatch || — || align=right | 2.6 km || 
|-id=888 bgcolor=#fefefe
| 43888 ||  || — || July 27, 1995 || Kitt Peak || Spacewatch || FLO || align=right | 1.6 km || 
|-id=889 bgcolor=#fefefe
| 43889 Osawatakaomi || 1995 QH ||  || August 17, 1995 || Nanyo || T. Okuni || FLO || align=right | 3.4 km || 
|-id=890 bgcolor=#fefefe
| 43890 Katiaottani ||  ||  || August 31, 1995 || Bologna || San Vittore Obs. || — || align=right | 1.7 km || 
|-id=891 bgcolor=#fefefe
| 43891 ||  || — || September 21, 1995 || Catalina Station || T. B. Spahr || — || align=right | 4.6 km || 
|-id=892 bgcolor=#fefefe
| 43892 ||  || — || September 19, 1995 || Kitt Peak || Spacewatch || — || align=right | 2.7 km || 
|-id=893 bgcolor=#E9E9E9
| 43893 ||  || — || September 21, 1995 || Kitt Peak || Spacewatch || — || align=right | 2.0 km || 
|-id=894 bgcolor=#fefefe
| 43894 || 1995 TP || — || October 12, 1995 || Sudbury || D. di Cicco || V || align=right | 1.7 km || 
|-id=895 bgcolor=#fefefe
| 43895 ||  || — || October 20, 1995 || Oizumi || T. Kobayashi || NYS || align=right | 2.1 km || 
|-id=896 bgcolor=#fefefe
| 43896 ||  || — || October 20, 1995 || Oizumi || T. Kobayashi || V || align=right | 3.6 km || 
|-id=897 bgcolor=#fefefe
| 43897 || 1995 VC || — || November 1, 1995 || Oizumi || T. Kobayashi || NYS || align=right | 2.6 km || 
|-id=898 bgcolor=#fefefe
| 43898 || 1995 VN || — || November 2, 1995 || Oizumi || T. Kobayashi || NYS || align=right | 3.1 km || 
|-id=899 bgcolor=#fefefe
| 43899 ||  || — || November 15, 1995 || Kitami || K. Endate, K. Watanabe || — || align=right | 2.6 km || 
|-id=900 bgcolor=#fefefe
| 43900 ||  || — || November 13, 1995 || Nachi-Katsuura || Y. Shimizu, T. Urata || NYS || align=right | 2.4 km || 
|}

43901–44000 

|-bgcolor=#fefefe
| 43901 ||  || — || November 14, 1995 || Kitt Peak || Spacewatch || NYS || align=right | 1.3 km || 
|-id=902 bgcolor=#fefefe
| 43902 ||  || — || November 14, 1995 || Kitt Peak || Spacewatch || NYS || align=right | 4.7 km || 
|-id=903 bgcolor=#fefefe
| 43903 || 1995 WC || — || November 16, 1995 || Oizumi || T. Kobayashi || — || align=right | 3.0 km || 
|-id=904 bgcolor=#fefefe
| 43904 || 1995 WO || — || November 16, 1995 || Oohira || T. Urata || slow? || align=right | 2.8 km || 
|-id=905 bgcolor=#fefefe
| 43905 ||  || — || November 16, 1995 || Kushiro || S. Ueda, H. Kaneda || NYS || align=right | 2.1 km || 
|-id=906 bgcolor=#fefefe
| 43906 ||  || — || November 20, 1995 || Oizumi || T. Kobayashi || NYS || align=right | 2.1 km || 
|-id=907 bgcolor=#fefefe
| 43907 ||  || — || November 20, 1995 || Oizumi || T. Kobayashi || — || align=right | 2.6 km || 
|-id=908 bgcolor=#fefefe
| 43908 Hiraku ||  ||  || November 21, 1995 || Nanyo || T. Okuni || — || align=right | 3.1 km || 
|-id=909 bgcolor=#E9E9E9
| 43909 ||  || — || November 28, 1995 || Nachi-Katsuura || Y. Shimizu, T. Urata || BRU || align=right | 9.8 km || 
|-id=910 bgcolor=#E9E9E9
| 43910 ||  || — || November 17, 1995 || Kitt Peak || Spacewatch || — || align=right | 2.4 km || 
|-id=911 bgcolor=#E9E9E9
| 43911 ||  || — || November 17, 1995 || Kitt Peak || Spacewatch || — || align=right | 8.7 km || 
|-id=912 bgcolor=#E9E9E9
| 43912 ||  || — || November 20, 1995 || Kitt Peak || Spacewatch || — || align=right | 2.9 km || 
|-id=913 bgcolor=#fefefe
| 43913 || 1995 YT || — || December 17, 1995 || Oizumi || T. Kobayashi || — || align=right | 2.3 km || 
|-id=914 bgcolor=#fefefe
| 43914 ||  || — || December 19, 1995 || Oizumi || T. Kobayashi || — || align=right | 2.2 km || 
|-id=915 bgcolor=#E9E9E9
| 43915 ||  || — || December 16, 1995 || Kitt Peak || Spacewatch || — || align=right | 3.2 km || 
|-id=916 bgcolor=#E9E9E9
| 43916 ||  || — || January 13, 1996 || Oizumi || T. Kobayashi || — || align=right | 3.8 km || 
|-id=917 bgcolor=#fefefe
| 43917 ||  || — || January 13, 1996 || Kitt Peak || Spacewatch || — || align=right | 2.2 km || 
|-id=918 bgcolor=#E9E9E9
| 43918 ||  || — || January 13, 1996 || Kitt Peak || Spacewatch || — || align=right | 2.5 km || 
|-id=919 bgcolor=#E9E9E9
| 43919 ||  || — || January 18, 1996 || Chichibu || N. Satō, T. Urata || — || align=right | 3.4 km || 
|-id=920 bgcolor=#E9E9E9
| 43920 ||  || — || February 12, 1996 || Kushiro || S. Ueda, H. Kaneda || GEF || align=right | 6.0 km || 
|-id=921 bgcolor=#E9E9E9
| 43921 ||  || — || February 10, 1996 || Kitt Peak || Spacewatch || — || align=right | 6.4 km || 
|-id=922 bgcolor=#E9E9E9
| 43922 ||  || — || February 10, 1996 || Kitt Peak || Spacewatch || HNS || align=right | 3.1 km || 
|-id=923 bgcolor=#E9E9E9
| 43923 Cosimonoccioli ||  ||  || February 14, 1996 || Cima Ekar || U. Munari, M. Tombelli || — || align=right | 3.6 km || 
|-id=924 bgcolor=#E9E9E9
| 43924 Martoni ||  ||  || February 22, 1996 || Stroncone || A. Vagnozzi || — || align=right | 2.9 km || 
|-id=925 bgcolor=#E9E9E9
| 43925 ||  || — || February 27, 1996 || Modra || P. Kolény, L. Kornoš || — || align=right | 3.4 km || 
|-id=926 bgcolor=#E9E9E9
| 43926 ||  || — || March 10, 1996 || Kitami || K. Endate, K. Watanabe || — || align=right | 6.1 km || 
|-id=927 bgcolor=#E9E9E9
| 43927 ||  || — || April 11, 1996 || Kitt Peak || Spacewatch || MIT || align=right | 6.0 km || 
|-id=928 bgcolor=#d6d6d6
| 43928 ||  || — || April 17, 1996 || La Silla || E. W. Elst || HYG || align=right | 5.5 km || 
|-id=929 bgcolor=#d6d6d6
| 43929 ||  || — || May 13, 1996 || Kitt Peak || Spacewatch || KOR || align=right | 3.5 km || 
|-id=930 bgcolor=#fefefe
| 43930 ||  || — || June 15, 1996 || Kitt Peak || Spacewatch || V || align=right | 2.0 km || 
|-id=931 bgcolor=#d6d6d6
| 43931 Yoshimi ||  ||  || August 9, 1996 || Nanyo || T. Okuni || ALA || align=right | 14 km || 
|-id=932 bgcolor=#fefefe
| 43932 || 1996 QH || — || August 16, 1996 || Haleakala || NEAT || — || align=right | 3.1 km || 
|-id=933 bgcolor=#E9E9E9
| 43933 ||  || — || September 7, 1996 || Kitt Peak || Spacewatch || — || align=right | 3.9 km || 
|-id=934 bgcolor=#d6d6d6
| 43934 || 1996 TC || — || October 1, 1996 || Sudbury || D. di Cicco || — || align=right | 8.6 km || 
|-id=935 bgcolor=#fefefe
| 43935 Danshechtman || 1996 TF ||  || October 1, 1996 || Colleverde || V. S. Casulli || — || align=right | 1.8 km || 
|-id=936 bgcolor=#d6d6d6
| 43936 ||  || — || October 11, 1996 || Kitami || K. Endate || — || align=right | 11 km || 
|-id=937 bgcolor=#fefefe
| 43937 ||  || — || October 6, 1996 || Kitt Peak || Spacewatch || — || align=right | 2.1 km || 
|-id=938 bgcolor=#E9E9E9
| 43938 ||  || — || October 5, 1996 || La Silla || E. W. Elst || — || align=right | 7.8 km || 
|-id=939 bgcolor=#fefefe
| 43939 ||  || — || October 5, 1996 || La Silla || E. W. Elst || EUT || align=right | 1.4 km || 
|-id=940 bgcolor=#d6d6d6
| 43940 ||  || — || December 7, 1996 || Oizumi || T. Kobayashi || 3:2 || align=right | 16 km || 
|-id=941 bgcolor=#fefefe
| 43941 || 1996 YP || — || December 20, 1996 || Oizumi || T. Kobayashi || V || align=right | 2.6 km || 
|-id=942 bgcolor=#fefefe
| 43942 || 1996 YX || — || December 20, 1996 || Oizumi || T. Kobayashi || — || align=right | 3.7 km || 
|-id=943 bgcolor=#fefefe
| 43943 || 1997 AV || — || January 2, 1997 || Oizumi || T. Kobayashi || — || align=right | 2.9 km || 
|-id=944 bgcolor=#fefefe
| 43944 ||  || — || January 3, 1997 || Oizumi || T. Kobayashi || FLO || align=right | 3.3 km || 
|-id=945 bgcolor=#fefefe
| 43945 ||  || — || January 3, 1997 || Oizumi || T. Kobayashi || — || align=right | 2.6 km || 
|-id=946 bgcolor=#fefefe
| 43946 ||  || — || January 7, 1997 || Oohira || T. Urata || — || align=right | 2.0 km || 
|-id=947 bgcolor=#fefefe
| 43947 ||  || — || January 9, 1997 || Oizumi || T. Kobayashi || — || align=right | 2.8 km || 
|-id=948 bgcolor=#fefefe
| 43948 ||  || — || January 10, 1997 || Oizumi || T. Kobayashi || — || align=right | 3.4 km || 
|-id=949 bgcolor=#fefefe
| 43949 ||  || — || January 9, 1997 || Chichibu || N. Satō || V || align=right | 2.9 km || 
|-id=950 bgcolor=#E9E9E9
| 43950 ||  || — || January 28, 1997 || Oizumi || T. Kobayashi || — || align=right | 4.7 km || 
|-id=951 bgcolor=#fefefe
| 43951 ||  || — || January 31, 1997 || Kitt Peak || Spacewatch || NYS || align=right | 1.7 km || 
|-id=952 bgcolor=#fefefe
| 43952 ||  || — || January 28, 1997 || Xinglong || SCAP || V || align=right | 1.4 km || 
|-id=953 bgcolor=#fefefe
| 43953 ||  || — || February 1, 1997 || Oizumi || T. Kobayashi || FLO || align=right | 2.2 km || 
|-id=954 bgcolor=#fefefe
| 43954 Chýnov ||  ||  || February 7, 1997 || Kleť || M. Tichý, Z. Moravec || V || align=right | 2.9 km || 
|-id=955 bgcolor=#fefefe
| 43955 Fixlmüller ||  ||  || February 6, 1997 || Linz || E. Meyer, E. Obermair || — || align=right | 1.5 km || 
|-id=956 bgcolor=#fefefe
| 43956 Elidoro ||  ||  || February 7, 1997 || Sormano || P. Sicoli, F. Manca || NYS || align=right | 3.9 km || 
|-id=957 bgcolor=#E9E9E9
| 43957 Invernizzi ||  ||  || February 7, 1997 || Sormano || P. Sicoli, F. Manca || RAF || align=right | 3.5 km || 
|-id=958 bgcolor=#fefefe
| 43958 ||  || — || February 6, 1997 || Kitt Peak || Spacewatch || — || align=right | 1.8 km || 
|-id=959 bgcolor=#fefefe
| 43959 ||  || — || February 12, 1997 || Nachi-Katsuura || Y. Shimizu, T. Urata || V || align=right | 3.7 km || 
|-id=960 bgcolor=#fefefe
| 43960 ||  || — || February 1, 1997 || Kitt Peak || Spacewatch || FLO || align=right | 2.0 km || 
|-id=961 bgcolor=#fefefe
| 43961 ||  || — || March 4, 1997 || Kitt Peak || Spacewatch || — || align=right | 2.8 km || 
|-id=962 bgcolor=#fefefe
| 43962 ||  || — || March 3, 1997 || Kitt Peak || Spacewatch || NYS || align=right | 2.8 km || 
|-id=963 bgcolor=#fefefe
| 43963 ||  || — || March 4, 1997 || Kitt Peak || Spacewatch || FLO || align=right | 1.5 km || 
|-id=964 bgcolor=#fefefe
| 43964 ||  || — || March 7, 1997 || Xinglong || SCAP || — || align=right | 3.6 km || 
|-id=965 bgcolor=#E9E9E9
| 43965 ||  || — || March 11, 1997 || Kitt Peak || Spacewatch || — || align=right | 4.0 km || 
|-id=966 bgcolor=#fefefe
| 43966 ||  || — || March 4, 1997 || Socorro || LINEAR || — || align=right | 3.1 km || 
|-id=967 bgcolor=#fefefe
| 43967 ||  || — || March 31, 1997 || Socorro || LINEAR || — || align=right | 3.4 km || 
|-id=968 bgcolor=#E9E9E9
| 43968 ||  || — || March 31, 1997 || Socorro || LINEAR || — || align=right | 3.6 km || 
|-id=969 bgcolor=#E9E9E9
| 43969 || 1997 GL || — || April 4, 1997 || Haleakala || NEAT || — || align=right | 2.4 km || 
|-id=970 bgcolor=#E9E9E9
| 43970 ||  || — || April 2, 1997 || Kitt Peak || Spacewatch || — || align=right | 3.0 km || 
|-id=971 bgcolor=#E9E9E9
| 43971 Gabzdyl ||  ||  || April 8, 1997 || Kleť || M. Tichý, Z. Moravec || — || align=right | 3.8 km || 
|-id=972 bgcolor=#E9E9E9
| 43972 ||  || — || April 2, 1997 || Socorro || LINEAR || ADE || align=right | 7.0 km || 
|-id=973 bgcolor=#E9E9E9
| 43973 ||  || — || April 2, 1997 || Socorro || LINEAR || — || align=right | 3.0 km || 
|-id=974 bgcolor=#E9E9E9
| 43974 ||  || — || April 3, 1997 || Socorro || LINEAR || — || align=right | 4.2 km || 
|-id=975 bgcolor=#fefefe
| 43975 ||  || — || April 3, 1997 || Socorro || LINEAR || NYS || align=right | 2.2 km || 
|-id=976 bgcolor=#fefefe
| 43976 ||  || — || April 3, 1997 || Socorro || LINEAR || — || align=right | 2.9 km || 
|-id=977 bgcolor=#fefefe
| 43977 ||  || — || April 3, 1997 || Socorro || LINEAR || NYS || align=right | 2.3 km || 
|-id=978 bgcolor=#E9E9E9
| 43978 ||  || — || April 3, 1997 || Socorro || LINEAR || — || align=right | 2.4 km || 
|-id=979 bgcolor=#E9E9E9
| 43979 ||  || — || April 3, 1997 || Socorro || LINEAR || — || align=right | 2.8 km || 
|-id=980 bgcolor=#E9E9E9
| 43980 ||  || — || April 6, 1997 || Socorro || LINEAR || — || align=right | 1.7 km || 
|-id=981 bgcolor=#E9E9E9
| 43981 ||  || — || April 6, 1997 || Socorro || LINEAR || — || align=right | 4.9 km || 
|-id=982 bgcolor=#E9E9E9
| 43982 ||  || — || April 15, 1997 || Xinglong || SCAP || RAF || align=right | 3.2 km || 
|-id=983 bgcolor=#E9E9E9
| 43983 ||  || — || April 6, 1997 || Socorro || LINEAR || — || align=right | 3.9 km || 
|-id=984 bgcolor=#E9E9E9
| 43984 ||  || — || April 30, 1997 || Socorro || LINEAR || — || align=right | 4.0 km || 
|-id=985 bgcolor=#E9E9E9
| 43985 ||  || — || April 30, 1997 || Socorro || LINEAR || — || align=right | 2.9 km || 
|-id=986 bgcolor=#E9E9E9
| 43986 ||  || — || April 30, 1997 || Socorro || LINEAR || — || align=right | 3.2 km || 
|-id=987 bgcolor=#E9E9E9
| 43987 ||  || — || May 6, 1997 || Kitt Peak || Spacewatch || — || align=right | 2.9 km || 
|-id=988 bgcolor=#E9E9E9
| 43988 ||  || — || May 31, 1997 || Kitt Peak || Spacewatch || PAD || align=right | 5.0 km || 
|-id=989 bgcolor=#d6d6d6
| 43989 ||  || — || June 9, 1997 || Lake Clear || K. A. Williams || — || align=right | 6.1 km || 
|-id=990 bgcolor=#E9E9E9
| 43990 ||  || — || June 7, 1997 || Kitt Peak || Spacewatch || — || align=right | 5.8 km || 
|-id=991 bgcolor=#E9E9E9
| 43991 ||  || — || June 28, 1997 || Kitt Peak || Spacewatch || MIT || align=right | 7.4 km || 
|-id=992 bgcolor=#d6d6d6
| 43992 || 1997 NP || — || July 1, 1997 || Kitt Peak || Spacewatch || — || align=right | 4.9 km || 
|-id=993 bgcolor=#E9E9E9
| 43993 Mariola || 1997 OK ||  || July 26, 1997 || Sormano || P. Sicoli, A. Testa || — || align=right | 7.0 km || 
|-id=994 bgcolor=#d6d6d6
| 43994 ||  || — || August 11, 1997 || Modra || A. Galád, A. Pravda || — || align=right | 5.0 km || 
|-id=995 bgcolor=#fefefe
| 43995 ||  || — || August 14, 1997 || Haleakala || AMOS || — || align=right | 3.5 km || 
|-id=996 bgcolor=#d6d6d6
| 43996 || 1997 QH || — || August 22, 1997 || Yatsuka || H. Abe || — || align=right | 5.6 km || 
|-id=997 bgcolor=#d6d6d6
| 43997 || 1997 QX || — || August 29, 1997 || Cloudcroft || W. Offutt || — || align=right | 3.7 km || 
|-id=998 bgcolor=#d6d6d6
| 43998 Nanyoshino ||  ||  || August 28, 1997 || Nanyo || T. Okuni || — || align=right | 14 km || 
|-id=999 bgcolor=#fefefe
| 43999 Gramigna ||  ||  || August 31, 1997 || Pianoro || V. Goretti || — || align=right | 2.1 km || 
|-id=000 bgcolor=#d6d6d6
| 44000 Lucka || 1997 RB ||  || September 1, 1997 || Kleť || Z. Moravec || — || align=right | 7.7 km || 
|}

References

External links 
 Discovery Circumstances: Numbered Minor Planets (40001)–(45000) (IAU Minor Planet Center)

0043